

576001–576100 

|-bgcolor=#fefefe
| 576001 ||  || — || January 24, 2012 || Haleakala || Pan-STARRS || H || align=right data-sort-value="0.52" | 520 m || 
|-id=002 bgcolor=#fefefe
| 576002 ||  || — || June 2, 2006 || Kitt Peak || Spacewatch ||  || align=right | 1.3 km || 
|-id=003 bgcolor=#E9E9E9
| 576003 ||  || — || December 30, 2011 || Kitt Peak || Spacewatch ||  || align=right data-sort-value="0.94" | 940 m || 
|-id=004 bgcolor=#FA8072
| 576004 ||  || — || January 3, 2012 || Mount Lemmon || Mount Lemmon Survey || H || align=right data-sort-value="0.40" | 400 m || 
|-id=005 bgcolor=#fefefe
| 576005 ||  || — || December 4, 2007 || Kitt Peak || Spacewatch ||  || align=right data-sort-value="0.98" | 980 m || 
|-id=006 bgcolor=#d6d6d6
| 576006 ||  || — || January 27, 2012 || Mount Lemmon || Mount Lemmon Survey ||  || align=right | 2.6 km || 
|-id=007 bgcolor=#fefefe
| 576007 ||  || — || January 27, 2012 || Mount Lemmon || Mount Lemmon Survey ||  || align=right data-sort-value="0.65" | 650 m || 
|-id=008 bgcolor=#fefefe
| 576008 ||  || — || January 18, 2012 || Kitt Peak || Spacewatch ||  || align=right data-sort-value="0.80" | 800 m || 
|-id=009 bgcolor=#fefefe
| 576009 ||  || — || July 10, 2005 || Kitt Peak || Spacewatch || H || align=right data-sort-value="0.60" | 600 m || 
|-id=010 bgcolor=#fefefe
| 576010 ||  || — || January 26, 2012 || Kitt Peak || Spacewatch ||  || align=right data-sort-value="0.80" | 800 m || 
|-id=011 bgcolor=#d6d6d6
| 576011 ||  || — || January 27, 2012 || Mount Lemmon || Mount Lemmon Survey ||  || align=right | 2.8 km || 
|-id=012 bgcolor=#fefefe
| 576012 ||  || — || February 2, 2005 || Kitt Peak || Spacewatch ||  || align=right data-sort-value="0.66" | 660 m || 
|-id=013 bgcolor=#d6d6d6
| 576013 ||  || — || January 27, 2012 || Mount Lemmon || Mount Lemmon Survey ||  || align=right | 2.7 km || 
|-id=014 bgcolor=#fefefe
| 576014 ||  || — || November 26, 2011 || Mount Lemmon || Mount Lemmon Survey ||  || align=right data-sort-value="0.83" | 830 m || 
|-id=015 bgcolor=#fefefe
| 576015 ||  || — || January 3, 2012 || Kitt Peak || Spacewatch ||  || align=right data-sort-value="0.73" | 730 m || 
|-id=016 bgcolor=#fefefe
| 576016 ||  || — || January 21, 2012 || Haleakala || Pan-STARRS || H || align=right data-sort-value="0.81" | 810 m || 
|-id=017 bgcolor=#fefefe
| 576017 ||  || — || January 26, 2012 || Kitt Peak || Spacewatch || H || align=right data-sort-value="0.53" | 530 m || 
|-id=018 bgcolor=#d6d6d6
| 576018 ||  || — || November 28, 2011 || Mount Lemmon || Mount Lemmon Survey ||  || align=right | 2.7 km || 
|-id=019 bgcolor=#E9E9E9
| 576019 ||  || — || February 11, 2008 || Kitt Peak || Spacewatch ||  || align=right data-sort-value="0.58" | 580 m || 
|-id=020 bgcolor=#fefefe
| 576020 ||  || — || February 17, 2001 || Haleakala || AMOS || H || align=right data-sort-value="0.88" | 880 m || 
|-id=021 bgcolor=#E9E9E9
| 576021 ||  || — || September 22, 2009 || Bergisch Gladbach || W. Bickel ||  || align=right | 1.6 km || 
|-id=022 bgcolor=#fefefe
| 576022 ||  || — || March 10, 2005 || Mount Lemmon || Mount Lemmon Survey ||  || align=right data-sort-value="0.81" | 810 m || 
|-id=023 bgcolor=#fefefe
| 576023 ||  || — || December 24, 2011 || Mount Lemmon || Mount Lemmon Survey ||  || align=right data-sort-value="0.83" | 830 m || 
|-id=024 bgcolor=#fefefe
| 576024 ||  || — || January 26, 2012 || Mount Lemmon || Mount Lemmon Survey ||  || align=right data-sort-value="0.85" | 850 m || 
|-id=025 bgcolor=#fefefe
| 576025 ||  || — || January 31, 2012 || Mount Lemmon || Mount Lemmon Survey ||  || align=right data-sort-value="0.79" | 790 m || 
|-id=026 bgcolor=#fefefe
| 576026 ||  || — || October 22, 2003 || Kitt Peak || Spacewatch ||  || align=right data-sort-value="0.74" | 740 m || 
|-id=027 bgcolor=#d6d6d6
| 576027 ||  || — || December 30, 2011 || Kitt Peak || Spacewatch ||  || align=right | 2.9 km || 
|-id=028 bgcolor=#E9E9E9
| 576028 ||  || — || January 29, 2012 || Haleakala || Pan-STARRS ||  || align=right | 1.5 km || 
|-id=029 bgcolor=#d6d6d6
| 576029 ||  || — || January 1, 2012 || Mount Lemmon || Mount Lemmon Survey ||  || align=right | 2.9 km || 
|-id=030 bgcolor=#d6d6d6
| 576030 ||  || — || January 18, 2012 || Mount Lemmon || Mount Lemmon Survey ||  || align=right | 2.3 km || 
|-id=031 bgcolor=#fefefe
| 576031 ||  || — || April 16, 2005 || Kitt Peak || Spacewatch ||  || align=right data-sort-value="0.91" | 910 m || 
|-id=032 bgcolor=#fefefe
| 576032 ||  || — || January 25, 2012 || Haleakala || Pan-STARRS || H || align=right data-sort-value="0.70" | 700 m || 
|-id=033 bgcolor=#d6d6d6
| 576033 ||  || — || October 29, 2005 || Mount Lemmon || Mount Lemmon Survey ||  || align=right | 3.1 km || 
|-id=034 bgcolor=#d6d6d6
| 576034 ||  || — || January 26, 2012 || Mount Lemmon || Mount Lemmon Survey ||  || align=right | 2.6 km || 
|-id=035 bgcolor=#d6d6d6
| 576035 ||  || — || April 9, 2008 || Kitt Peak || Spacewatch ||  || align=right | 2.8 km || 
|-id=036 bgcolor=#fefefe
| 576036 ||  || — || January 26, 2012 || Mount Lemmon || Mount Lemmon Survey || H || align=right data-sort-value="0.41" | 410 m || 
|-id=037 bgcolor=#fefefe
| 576037 ||  || — || August 22, 2014 || Haleakala || Pan-STARRS ||  || align=right data-sort-value="0.86" | 860 m || 
|-id=038 bgcolor=#d6d6d6
| 576038 ||  || — || July 12, 2015 || Haleakala || Pan-STARRS ||  || align=right | 3.1 km || 
|-id=039 bgcolor=#fefefe
| 576039 ||  || — || March 24, 2015 || Mount Lemmon || Mount Lemmon Survey || H || align=right data-sort-value="0.64" | 640 m || 
|-id=040 bgcolor=#E9E9E9
| 576040 ||  || — || February 29, 2008 || Kitt Peak || Spacewatch ||  || align=right | 1.1 km || 
|-id=041 bgcolor=#d6d6d6
| 576041 ||  || — || January 18, 2012 || Mount Lemmon || Mount Lemmon Survey ||  || align=right | 2.6 km || 
|-id=042 bgcolor=#d6d6d6
| 576042 ||  || — || June 2, 2014 || Haleakala || Pan-STARRS ||  || align=right | 2.5 km || 
|-id=043 bgcolor=#fefefe
| 576043 ||  || — || August 28, 2013 || Catalina || CSS || H || align=right data-sort-value="0.67" | 670 m || 
|-id=044 bgcolor=#d6d6d6
| 576044 ||  || — || January 21, 2012 || Kitt Peak || Spacewatch || 7:4 || align=right | 2.9 km || 
|-id=045 bgcolor=#fefefe
| 576045 ||  || — || January 19, 2012 || Haleakala || Pan-STARRS || H || align=right data-sort-value="0.49" | 490 m || 
|-id=046 bgcolor=#fefefe
| 576046 ||  || — || January 26, 2012 || Haleakala || Pan-STARRS ||  || align=right data-sort-value="0.71" | 710 m || 
|-id=047 bgcolor=#d6d6d6
| 576047 ||  || — || January 19, 2012 || Haleakala || Pan-STARRS || 7:4 || align=right | 3.2 km || 
|-id=048 bgcolor=#fefefe
| 576048 ||  || — || January 27, 2012 || Mount Lemmon || Mount Lemmon Survey ||  || align=right data-sort-value="0.65" | 650 m || 
|-id=049 bgcolor=#fefefe
| 576049 ||  || — || January 19, 2008 || Mount Lemmon || Mount Lemmon Survey ||  || align=right | 1.1 km || 
|-id=050 bgcolor=#fefefe
| 576050 ||  || — || November 18, 2007 || Mount Lemmon || Mount Lemmon Survey ||  || align=right data-sort-value="0.95" | 950 m || 
|-id=051 bgcolor=#fefefe
| 576051 ||  || — || February 1, 2012 || Kitt Peak || Spacewatch ||  || align=right data-sort-value="0.55" | 550 m || 
|-id=052 bgcolor=#fefefe
| 576052 ||  || — || March 20, 2002 || Kitt Peak || Spacewatch ||  || align=right data-sort-value="0.65" | 650 m || 
|-id=053 bgcolor=#fefefe
| 576053 ||  || — || February 1, 2012 || Bergisch Gladbach || W. Bickel ||  || align=right data-sort-value="0.64" | 640 m || 
|-id=054 bgcolor=#fefefe
| 576054 ||  || — || February 3, 2012 || Haleakala || Pan-STARRS ||  || align=right data-sort-value="0.53" | 530 m || 
|-id=055 bgcolor=#d6d6d6
| 576055 ||  || — || January 29, 2012 || Kitt Peak || Spacewatch || 7:4 || align=right | 3.1 km || 
|-id=056 bgcolor=#d6d6d6
| 576056 ||  || — || October 12, 2010 || Catalina || CSS ||  || align=right | 3.4 km || 
|-id=057 bgcolor=#fefefe
| 576057 ||  || — || January 26, 2012 || Haleakala || Pan-STARRS ||  || align=right data-sort-value="0.79" | 790 m || 
|-id=058 bgcolor=#fefefe
| 576058 ||  || — || February 2, 2008 || Mount Lemmon || Mount Lemmon Survey ||  || align=right | 1.2 km || 
|-id=059 bgcolor=#E9E9E9
| 576059 ||  || — || February 13, 2012 || Haleakala || Pan-STARRS ||  || align=right data-sort-value="0.94" | 940 m || 
|-id=060 bgcolor=#d6d6d6
| 576060 ||  || — || February 1, 2012 || Kitt Peak || Spacewatch ||  || align=right | 2.6 km || 
|-id=061 bgcolor=#fefefe
| 576061 ||  || — || October 6, 2007 || Bergisch Gladbach || W. Bickel ||  || align=right data-sort-value="0.81" | 810 m || 
|-id=062 bgcolor=#fefefe
| 576062 ||  || — || December 16, 2007 || Mount Lemmon || Mount Lemmon Survey ||  || align=right data-sort-value="0.90" | 900 m || 
|-id=063 bgcolor=#fefefe
| 576063 ||  || — || October 14, 2007 || Mount Lemmon || Mount Lemmon Survey ||  || align=right data-sort-value="0.59" | 590 m || 
|-id=064 bgcolor=#fefefe
| 576064 ||  || — || January 21, 2012 || Kitt Peak || Spacewatch || H || align=right data-sort-value="0.56" | 560 m || 
|-id=065 bgcolor=#E9E9E9
| 576065 ||  || — || January 17, 2007 || Kitt Peak || Spacewatch ||  || align=right | 2.1 km || 
|-id=066 bgcolor=#E9E9E9
| 576066 ||  || — || March 5, 2008 || Mount Lemmon || Mount Lemmon Survey ||  || align=right data-sort-value="0.75" | 750 m || 
|-id=067 bgcolor=#fefefe
| 576067 ||  || — || September 26, 2003 || Apache Point || SDSS Collaboration || NYS || align=right data-sort-value="0.70" | 700 m || 
|-id=068 bgcolor=#FA8072
| 576068 ||  || — || February 13, 2012 || Kitt Peak || Spacewatch || H || align=right data-sort-value="0.52" | 520 m || 
|-id=069 bgcolor=#fefefe
| 576069 ||  || — || October 27, 2003 || Anderson Mesa || LONEOS ||  || align=right | 1.1 km || 
|-id=070 bgcolor=#d6d6d6
| 576070 ||  || — || April 14, 2008 || Mount Lemmon || Mount Lemmon Survey ||  || align=right | 2.8 km || 
|-id=071 bgcolor=#d6d6d6
| 576071 ||  || — || January 20, 2018 || Haleakala || Pan-STARRS ||  || align=right | 2.5 km || 
|-id=072 bgcolor=#fefefe
| 576072 ||  || — || February 15, 2012 || Haleakala || Pan-STARRS ||  || align=right data-sort-value="0.68" | 680 m || 
|-id=073 bgcolor=#d6d6d6
| 576073 ||  || — || February 14, 2012 || Haleakala || Pan-STARRS ||  || align=right | 2.2 km || 
|-id=074 bgcolor=#fefefe
| 576074 ||  || — || January 21, 2012 || Haleakala || Pan-STARRS ||  || align=right data-sort-value="0.73" | 730 m || 
|-id=075 bgcolor=#fefefe
| 576075 ||  || — || February 19, 2012 || Charleston || R. Holmes ||  || align=right data-sort-value="0.96" | 960 m || 
|-id=076 bgcolor=#E9E9E9
| 576076 ||  || — || February 18, 2012 || Kachina || J. Hobart ||  || align=right | 1.1 km || 
|-id=077 bgcolor=#E9E9E9
| 576077 ||  || — || January 30, 2008 || Mount Lemmon || Mount Lemmon Survey ||  || align=right data-sort-value="0.74" | 740 m || 
|-id=078 bgcolor=#fefefe
| 576078 ||  || — || February 16, 2012 || Haleakala || Pan-STARRS || H || align=right data-sort-value="0.58" | 580 m || 
|-id=079 bgcolor=#fefefe
| 576079 ||  || — || February 19, 2012 || Kitt Peak || Spacewatch ||  || align=right data-sort-value="0.68" | 680 m || 
|-id=080 bgcolor=#FA8072
| 576080 ||  || — || January 31, 2012 || Mayhill-ISON || L. Elenin ||  || align=right | 1.2 km || 
|-id=081 bgcolor=#fefefe
| 576081 ||  || — || January 19, 2008 || Mount Lemmon || Mount Lemmon Survey ||  || align=right | 1.1 km || 
|-id=082 bgcolor=#fefefe
| 576082 ||  || — || February 24, 2012 || Kitt Peak || Spacewatch || H || align=right data-sort-value="0.59" | 590 m || 
|-id=083 bgcolor=#E9E9E9
| 576083 ||  || — || February 21, 2012 || Kitt Peak || Spacewatch ||  || align=right | 1.7 km || 
|-id=084 bgcolor=#E9E9E9
| 576084 ||  || — || February 23, 2012 || Kitt Peak || Spacewatch ||  || align=right data-sort-value="0.82" | 820 m || 
|-id=085 bgcolor=#fefefe
| 576085 ||  || — || February 22, 2012 || Kitt Peak || Spacewatch ||  || align=right data-sort-value="0.47" | 470 m || 
|-id=086 bgcolor=#E9E9E9
| 576086 ||  || — || January 18, 2012 || Mount Lemmon || Mount Lemmon Survey ||  || align=right data-sort-value="0.91" | 910 m || 
|-id=087 bgcolor=#fefefe
| 576087 ||  || — || January 2, 2012 || Siding Spring || SSS || H || align=right data-sort-value="0.85" | 850 m || 
|-id=088 bgcolor=#E9E9E9
| 576088 ||  || — || February 25, 2012 || Catalina || CSS ||  || align=right | 1.0 km || 
|-id=089 bgcolor=#fefefe
| 576089 ||  || — || February 24, 2012 || Mount Lemmon || Mount Lemmon Survey ||  || align=right data-sort-value="0.60" | 600 m || 
|-id=090 bgcolor=#fefefe
| 576090 ||  || — || March 10, 2005 || Mount Lemmon || Mount Lemmon Survey || MAS || align=right data-sort-value="0.66" | 660 m || 
|-id=091 bgcolor=#E9E9E9
| 576091 ||  || — || August 28, 2005 || Kitt Peak || Spacewatch ||  || align=right data-sort-value="0.85" | 850 m || 
|-id=092 bgcolor=#fefefe
| 576092 ||  || — || January 31, 2012 || Mayhill-ISON || L. Elenin || H || align=right data-sort-value="0.77" | 770 m || 
|-id=093 bgcolor=#E9E9E9
| 576093 ||  || — || May 6, 2008 || Siding Spring || SSS ||  || align=right | 1.9 km || 
|-id=094 bgcolor=#d6d6d6
| 576094 ||  || — || February 14, 2012 || Haleakala || Pan-STARRS ||  || align=right | 2.3 km || 
|-id=095 bgcolor=#d6d6d6
| 576095 ||  || — || February 14, 2012 || Haleakala || Pan-STARRS ||  || align=right | 2.3 km || 
|-id=096 bgcolor=#E9E9E9
| 576096 ||  || — || March 5, 2008 || Mount Lemmon || Mount Lemmon Survey ||  || align=right data-sort-value="0.62" | 620 m || 
|-id=097 bgcolor=#E9E9E9
| 576097 ||  || — || February 28, 2012 || Haleakala || Pan-STARRS ||  || align=right | 1.7 km || 
|-id=098 bgcolor=#E9E9E9
| 576098 ||  || — || February 27, 2012 || Haleakala || Pan-STARRS ||  || align=right data-sort-value="0.79" | 790 m || 
|-id=099 bgcolor=#E9E9E9
| 576099 ||  || — || April 30, 2004 || Kitt Peak || Spacewatch ||  || align=right data-sort-value="0.67" | 670 m || 
|-id=100 bgcolor=#E9E9E9
| 576100 ||  || — || February 21, 2012 || Mount Lemmon || Mount Lemmon Survey ||  || align=right | 1.5 km || 
|}

576101–576200 

|-bgcolor=#d6d6d6
| 576101 ||  || — || February 28, 2012 || Haleakala || Pan-STARRS || 3:2 || align=right | 3.9 km || 
|-id=102 bgcolor=#E9E9E9
| 576102 ||  || — || February 20, 2012 || Kitt Peak || Spacewatch ||  || align=right data-sort-value="0.64" | 640 m || 
|-id=103 bgcolor=#fefefe
| 576103 ||  || — || February 25, 2012 || Kitt Peak || Spacewatch ||  || align=right data-sort-value="0.61" | 610 m || 
|-id=104 bgcolor=#E9E9E9
| 576104 ||  || — || February 24, 2012 || Mount Lemmon || Mount Lemmon Survey ||  || align=right | 1.4 km || 
|-id=105 bgcolor=#d6d6d6
| 576105 ||  || — || February 25, 2012 || Mount Lemmon || Mount Lemmon Survey ||  || align=right | 2.7 km || 
|-id=106 bgcolor=#d6d6d6
| 576106 ||  || — || January 19, 2012 || Mount Lemmon || Mount Lemmon Survey || 7:4 || align=right | 3.1 km || 
|-id=107 bgcolor=#E9E9E9
| 576107 ||  || — || September 27, 2002 || Palomar || NEAT ||  || align=right | 1.6 km || 
|-id=108 bgcolor=#fefefe
| 576108 ||  || — || January 19, 2004 || Kitt Peak || Spacewatch ||  || align=right data-sort-value="0.88" | 880 m || 
|-id=109 bgcolor=#E9E9E9
| 576109 ||  || — || November 20, 2006 || Kitt Peak || Spacewatch ||  || align=right | 1.4 km || 
|-id=110 bgcolor=#E9E9E9
| 576110 ||  || — || March 14, 2012 || Haleakala || Pan-STARRS ||  || align=right | 1.7 km || 
|-id=111 bgcolor=#fefefe
| 576111 ||  || — || April 25, 2004 || Apache Point || SDSS Collaboration || H || align=right data-sort-value="0.81" | 810 m || 
|-id=112 bgcolor=#E9E9E9
| 576112 ||  || — || February 25, 2012 || Kitt Peak || Spacewatch ||  || align=right data-sort-value="0.67" | 670 m || 
|-id=113 bgcolor=#d6d6d6
| 576113 ||  || — || March 15, 2012 || Mount Lemmon || Mount Lemmon Survey ||  || align=right | 2.3 km || 
|-id=114 bgcolor=#E9E9E9
| 576114 ||  || — || August 27, 2005 || Palomar || NEAT ||  || align=right data-sort-value="0.85" | 850 m || 
|-id=115 bgcolor=#d6d6d6
| 576115 ||  || — || March 15, 2012 || Kitt Peak || T. Vorobjov || 7:4 || align=right | 3.3 km || 
|-id=116 bgcolor=#E9E9E9
| 576116 ||  || — || March 14, 2012 || Kitt Peak || Spacewatch ||  || align=right data-sort-value="0.77" | 770 m || 
|-id=117 bgcolor=#fefefe
| 576117 ||  || — || March 15, 2012 || Mount Lemmon || Mount Lemmon Survey ||  || align=right data-sort-value="0.82" | 820 m || 
|-id=118 bgcolor=#E9E9E9
| 576118 ||  || — || July 13, 2013 || Haleakala || Pan-STARRS ||  || align=right data-sort-value="0.82" | 820 m || 
|-id=119 bgcolor=#E9E9E9
| 576119 ||  || — || March 13, 2012 || Mount Lemmon || Mount Lemmon Survey ||  || align=right data-sort-value="0.75" | 750 m || 
|-id=120 bgcolor=#fefefe
| 576120 ||  || — || March 15, 2012 || Mount Lemmon || Mount Lemmon Survey ||  || align=right data-sort-value="0.63" | 630 m || 
|-id=121 bgcolor=#E9E9E9
| 576121 ||  || — || March 15, 2012 || Mount Lemmon || Mount Lemmon Survey ||  || align=right data-sort-value="0.74" | 740 m || 
|-id=122 bgcolor=#fefefe
| 576122 ||  || — || April 30, 2009 || Kitt Peak || Spacewatch ||  || align=right data-sort-value="0.59" | 590 m || 
|-id=123 bgcolor=#E9E9E9
| 576123 ||  || — || September 19, 2009 || Mount Lemmon || Mount Lemmon Survey ||  || align=right | 1.8 km || 
|-id=124 bgcolor=#E9E9E9
| 576124 ||  || — || March 16, 2012 || Mount Lemmon || Mount Lemmon Survey ||  || align=right | 1.3 km || 
|-id=125 bgcolor=#E9E9E9
| 576125 ||  || — || March 29, 2004 || Kitt Peak || Spacewatch ||  || align=right data-sort-value="0.83" | 830 m || 
|-id=126 bgcolor=#E9E9E9
| 576126 ||  || — || March 16, 2012 || Piszkesteto || K. Sárneczky ||  || align=right | 1.1 km || 
|-id=127 bgcolor=#fefefe
| 576127 ||  || — || March 17, 2012 || Mount Lemmon || Mount Lemmon Survey ||  || align=right data-sort-value="0.68" | 680 m || 
|-id=128 bgcolor=#E9E9E9
| 576128 ||  || — || March 22, 2012 || Mount Lemmon || Mount Lemmon Survey ||  || align=right | 1.2 km || 
|-id=129 bgcolor=#E9E9E9
| 576129 ||  || — || March 23, 2012 || Mount Lemmon || Mount Lemmon Survey ||  || align=right | 1.4 km || 
|-id=130 bgcolor=#E9E9E9
| 576130 ||  || — || March 25, 2012 || Marly || P. Kocher ||  || align=right | 1.3 km || 
|-id=131 bgcolor=#E9E9E9
| 576131 ||  || — || February 28, 2012 || Haleakala || Pan-STARRS ||  || align=right | 1.0 km || 
|-id=132 bgcolor=#fefefe
| 576132 ||  || — || November 27, 2010 || Mount Lemmon || Mount Lemmon Survey ||  || align=right data-sort-value="0.71" | 710 m || 
|-id=133 bgcolor=#E9E9E9
| 576133 ||  || — || March 27, 2012 || Mount Lemmon || Mount Lemmon Survey ||  || align=right data-sort-value="0.76" | 760 m || 
|-id=134 bgcolor=#E9E9E9
| 576134 ||  || — || February 28, 2012 || Haleakala || Pan-STARRS ||  || align=right data-sort-value="0.86" | 860 m || 
|-id=135 bgcolor=#E9E9E9
| 576135 ||  || — || March 30, 2008 || Catalina || CSS ||  || align=right data-sort-value="0.91" | 910 m || 
|-id=136 bgcolor=#E9E9E9
| 576136 ||  || — || March 29, 2012 || Haleakala || Pan-STARRS ||  || align=right data-sort-value="0.73" | 730 m || 
|-id=137 bgcolor=#E9E9E9
| 576137 ||  || — || October 3, 2005 || Kitt Peak || Spacewatch ||  || align=right | 2.2 km || 
|-id=138 bgcolor=#E9E9E9
| 576138 ||  || — || March 24, 2012 || Mount Lemmon || Mount Lemmon Survey ||  || align=right data-sort-value="0.99" | 990 m || 
|-id=139 bgcolor=#fefefe
| 576139 ||  || — || February 26, 2015 || Mount Lemmon || Mount Lemmon Survey ||  || align=right data-sort-value="0.82" | 820 m || 
|-id=140 bgcolor=#E9E9E9
| 576140 ||  || — || March 16, 2012 || Mount Lemmon || Mount Lemmon Survey ||  || align=right data-sort-value="0.88" | 880 m || 
|-id=141 bgcolor=#E9E9E9
| 576141 ||  || — || April 16, 2008 || Mount Lemmon || Mount Lemmon Survey ||  || align=right data-sort-value="0.80" | 800 m || 
|-id=142 bgcolor=#E9E9E9
| 576142 ||  || — || September 7, 2004 || Kitt Peak || Spacewatch ||  || align=right | 1.3 km || 
|-id=143 bgcolor=#E9E9E9
| 576143 ||  || — || March 27, 2012 || Mount Lemmon || Mount Lemmon Survey ||  || align=right | 1.0 km || 
|-id=144 bgcolor=#E9E9E9
| 576144 ||  || — || March 27, 2012 || Mount Lemmon || Mount Lemmon Survey ||  || align=right data-sort-value="0.85" | 850 m || 
|-id=145 bgcolor=#fefefe
| 576145 ||  || — || March 25, 2012 || Mount Lemmon || Mount Lemmon Survey ||  || align=right data-sort-value="0.82" | 820 m || 
|-id=146 bgcolor=#E9E9E9
| 576146 ||  || — || August 30, 2014 || Haleakala || Pan-STARRS ||  || align=right data-sort-value="0.80" | 800 m || 
|-id=147 bgcolor=#E9E9E9
| 576147 ||  || — || March 28, 2012 || Kitt Peak || Spacewatch ||  || align=right | 1.1 km || 
|-id=148 bgcolor=#E9E9E9
| 576148 ||  || — || March 29, 2012 || Kitt Peak || Spacewatch ||  || align=right | 1.7 km || 
|-id=149 bgcolor=#E9E9E9
| 576149 ||  || — || April 2, 2012 || Catalina || CSS ||  || align=right | 1.5 km || 
|-id=150 bgcolor=#E9E9E9
| 576150 ||  || — || April 11, 2008 || Mount Lemmon || Mount Lemmon Survey ||  || align=right data-sort-value="0.75" | 750 m || 
|-id=151 bgcolor=#E9E9E9
| 576151 ||  || — || September 24, 2009 || Kitt Peak || Spacewatch ||  || align=right data-sort-value="0.92" | 920 m || 
|-id=152 bgcolor=#E9E9E9
| 576152 ||  || — || February 26, 2012 || Kitt Peak || Spacewatch ||  || align=right data-sort-value="0.89" | 890 m || 
|-id=153 bgcolor=#E9E9E9
| 576153 ||  || — || May 1, 2008 || Kitt Peak || Spacewatch ||  || align=right data-sort-value="0.98" | 980 m || 
|-id=154 bgcolor=#E9E9E9
| 576154 ||  || — || August 21, 2004 || Siding Spring || SSS ||  || align=right | 1.6 km || 
|-id=155 bgcolor=#E9E9E9
| 576155 ||  || — || April 3, 2008 || Kitt Peak || Spacewatch ||  || align=right data-sort-value="0.83" | 830 m || 
|-id=156 bgcolor=#E9E9E9
| 576156 ||  || — || April 15, 2012 || Haleakala || Pan-STARRS ||  || align=right data-sort-value="0.87" | 870 m || 
|-id=157 bgcolor=#E9E9E9
| 576157 ||  || — || July 20, 2004 || Siding Spring || SSS ||  || align=right | 1.6 km || 
|-id=158 bgcolor=#E9E9E9
| 576158 ||  || — || April 15, 2012 || Haleakala || Pan-STARRS ||  || align=right | 1.1 km || 
|-id=159 bgcolor=#fefefe
| 576159 ||  || — || April 11, 2012 || Mount Lemmon || Mount Lemmon Survey ||  || align=right data-sort-value="0.61" | 610 m || 
|-id=160 bgcolor=#E9E9E9
| 576160 ||  || — || April 1, 2008 || Kitt Peak || Spacewatch || EUN || align=right data-sort-value="0.84" | 840 m || 
|-id=161 bgcolor=#d6d6d6
| 576161 ||  || — || September 20, 2003 || Kitt Peak || Spacewatch ||  || align=right | 3.5 km || 
|-id=162 bgcolor=#C7FF8F
| 576162 ||  || — || February 2, 2011 || Haleakala || Pan-STARRS || centaur || align=right | 54 km || 
|-id=163 bgcolor=#E9E9E9
| 576163 ||  || — || October 5, 2013 || Haleakala || Pan-STARRS ||  || align=right | 1.1 km || 
|-id=164 bgcolor=#E9E9E9
| 576164 ||  || — || April 3, 2016 || Haleakala || Pan-STARRS ||  || align=right data-sort-value="0.93" | 930 m || 
|-id=165 bgcolor=#E9E9E9
| 576165 ||  || — || April 15, 2012 || Haleakala || Pan-STARRS ||  || align=right | 1.6 km || 
|-id=166 bgcolor=#E9E9E9
| 576166 ||  || — || April 13, 2012 || Siding Spring || SSS ||  || align=right data-sort-value="0.79" | 790 m || 
|-id=167 bgcolor=#E9E9E9
| 576167 ||  || — || January 8, 2016 || Haleakala || Pan-STARRS ||  || align=right data-sort-value="0.82" | 820 m || 
|-id=168 bgcolor=#d6d6d6
| 576168 ||  || — || August 31, 2014 || Haleakala || Pan-STARRS ||  || align=right | 3.1 km || 
|-id=169 bgcolor=#fefefe
| 576169 ||  || — || June 21, 2017 || Haleakala || Pan-STARRS ||  || align=right data-sort-value="0.88" | 880 m || 
|-id=170 bgcolor=#E9E9E9
| 576170 ||  || — || April 1, 2012 || Mount Lemmon || Mount Lemmon Survey ||  || align=right data-sort-value="0.73" | 730 m || 
|-id=171 bgcolor=#fefefe
| 576171 ||  || — || April 16, 2012 || Haleakala || Pan-STARRS || H || align=right data-sort-value="0.62" | 620 m || 
|-id=172 bgcolor=#E9E9E9
| 576172 ||  || — || December 31, 2011 || Mount Lemmon || Mount Lemmon Survey ||  || align=right | 1.6 km || 
|-id=173 bgcolor=#E9E9E9
| 576173 ||  || — || April 16, 2012 || Kitt Peak || Spacewatch ||  || align=right data-sort-value="0.91" | 910 m || 
|-id=174 bgcolor=#E9E9E9
| 576174 ||  || — || August 6, 2004 || Palomar || NEAT ||  || align=right | 1.4 km || 
|-id=175 bgcolor=#d6d6d6
| 576175 ||  || — || February 21, 2012 || Mount Lemmon || Mount Lemmon Survey || 7:4 || align=right | 3.8 km || 
|-id=176 bgcolor=#E9E9E9
| 576176 ||  || — || March 15, 2012 || Mount Lemmon || Mount Lemmon Survey ||  || align=right | 1.2 km || 
|-id=177 bgcolor=#E9E9E9
| 576177 ||  || — || November 1, 2005 || Mount Lemmon || Mount Lemmon Survey ||  || align=right | 1.9 km || 
|-id=178 bgcolor=#E9E9E9
| 576178 ||  || — || April 15, 2012 || Haleakala || Pan-STARRS ||  || align=right data-sort-value="0.85" | 850 m || 
|-id=179 bgcolor=#E9E9E9
| 576179 ||  || — || April 15, 2012 || Haleakala || Pan-STARRS ||  || align=right | 1.6 km || 
|-id=180 bgcolor=#E9E9E9
| 576180 ||  || — || April 21, 2012 || Haleakala || Pan-STARRS ||  || align=right data-sort-value="0.94" | 940 m || 
|-id=181 bgcolor=#E9E9E9
| 576181 ||  || — || April 22, 2012 || Mount Lemmon || Mount Lemmon Survey ||  || align=right data-sort-value="0.84" | 840 m || 
|-id=182 bgcolor=#E9E9E9
| 576182 ||  || — || March 22, 2012 || Catalina || CSS ||  || align=right | 1.9 km || 
|-id=183 bgcolor=#fefefe
| 576183 ||  || — || March 28, 2012 || Mount Lemmon || Mount Lemmon Survey || H || align=right data-sort-value="0.64" | 640 m || 
|-id=184 bgcolor=#fefefe
| 576184 ||  || — || March 14, 2012 || Haleakala || Pan-STARRS || H || align=right data-sort-value="0.45" | 450 m || 
|-id=185 bgcolor=#E9E9E9
| 576185 ||  || — || April 27, 2012 || Haleakala || Pan-STARRS ||  || align=right | 1.4 km || 
|-id=186 bgcolor=#E9E9E9
| 576186 ||  || — || January 20, 2007 || Mauna Kea || Mauna Kea Obs. || EUN || align=right | 1.0 km || 
|-id=187 bgcolor=#E9E9E9
| 576187 ||  || — || January 27, 2003 || Haleakala || AMOS ||  || align=right | 1.8 km || 
|-id=188 bgcolor=#E9E9E9
| 576188 ||  || — || April 18, 2012 || Kitt Peak || Spacewatch ||  || align=right | 1.5 km || 
|-id=189 bgcolor=#E9E9E9
| 576189 ||  || — || December 1, 2005 || Kitt Peak || L. H. Wasserman, R. Millis ||  || align=right data-sort-value="0.70" | 700 m || 
|-id=190 bgcolor=#E9E9E9
| 576190 ||  || — || April 1, 2012 || Haleakala || Pan-STARRS ||  || align=right data-sort-value="0.92" | 920 m || 
|-id=191 bgcolor=#E9E9E9
| 576191 ||  || — || October 23, 2001 || Palomar || NEAT ||  || align=right | 1.4 km || 
|-id=192 bgcolor=#E9E9E9
| 576192 ||  || — || April 24, 2012 || Mount Lemmon || Mount Lemmon Survey ||  || align=right | 1.1 km || 
|-id=193 bgcolor=#E9E9E9
| 576193 ||  || — || March 16, 2012 || Kitt Peak || Spacewatch ||  || align=right data-sort-value="0.81" | 810 m || 
|-id=194 bgcolor=#E9E9E9
| 576194 ||  || — || February 10, 2008 || Mount Lemmon || Mount Lemmon Survey ||  || align=right data-sort-value="0.96" | 960 m || 
|-id=195 bgcolor=#E9E9E9
| 576195 ||  || — || April 4, 2003 || Kitt Peak || Spacewatch ||  || align=right | 1.9 km || 
|-id=196 bgcolor=#E9E9E9
| 576196 ||  || — || April 19, 2012 || Mount Lemmon || Mount Lemmon Survey ||  || align=right | 1.4 km || 
|-id=197 bgcolor=#E9E9E9
| 576197 ||  || — || April 19, 2012 || Haleakala || Pan-STARRS ||  || align=right | 1.3 km || 
|-id=198 bgcolor=#E9E9E9
| 576198 ||  || — || March 17, 2012 || Mount Lemmon || Mount Lemmon Survey ||  || align=right data-sort-value="0.89" | 890 m || 
|-id=199 bgcolor=#E9E9E9
| 576199 ||  || — || September 18, 2001 || Anderson Mesa || LONEOS ||  || align=right | 1.7 km || 
|-id=200 bgcolor=#E9E9E9
| 576200 ||  || — || March 29, 2012 || Kitt Peak || Spacewatch ||  || align=right | 1.1 km || 
|}

576201–576300 

|-bgcolor=#E9E9E9
| 576201 ||  || — || June 13, 2004 || Kitt Peak || Spacewatch ||  || align=right | 1.7 km || 
|-id=202 bgcolor=#E9E9E9
| 576202 ||  || — || January 18, 2007 || Palomar || NEAT || (194) || align=right | 2.1 km || 
|-id=203 bgcolor=#E9E9E9
| 576203 ||  || — || April 22, 2012 || Kitt Peak || Spacewatch ||  || align=right | 1.1 km || 
|-id=204 bgcolor=#E9E9E9
| 576204 ||  || — || March 16, 2012 || Kitt Peak || Spacewatch ||  || align=right | 1.2 km || 
|-id=205 bgcolor=#E9E9E9
| 576205 ||  || — || April 20, 2012 || Mount Lemmon || Mount Lemmon Survey ||  || align=right data-sort-value="0.94" | 940 m || 
|-id=206 bgcolor=#E9E9E9
| 576206 ||  || — || April 30, 2012 || Mount Lemmon || Mount Lemmon Survey ||  || align=right | 2.5 km || 
|-id=207 bgcolor=#E9E9E9
| 576207 ||  || — || April 30, 2012 || Mount Lemmon || Mount Lemmon Survey ||  || align=right | 1.0 km || 
|-id=208 bgcolor=#E9E9E9
| 576208 ||  || — || October 2, 2005 || Mount Lemmon || Mount Lemmon Survey ||  || align=right | 1.3 km || 
|-id=209 bgcolor=#E9E9E9
| 576209 ||  || — || April 30, 2012 || Mount Lemmon || Mount Lemmon Survey ||  || align=right | 1.3 km || 
|-id=210 bgcolor=#E9E9E9
| 576210 ||  || — || March 4, 2012 || Kitt Peak || Spacewatch ||  || align=right | 1.2 km || 
|-id=211 bgcolor=#E9E9E9
| 576211 ||  || — || April 1, 2003 || Palomar || NEAT ||  || align=right | 1.7 km || 
|-id=212 bgcolor=#C2E0FF
| 576212 ||  || — || April 27, 2012 || Haleakala || Pan-STARRS || other TNO || align=right | 222 km || 
|-id=213 bgcolor=#E9E9E9
| 576213 ||  || — || April 24, 2012 || Haleakala || Pan-STARRS ||  || align=right | 1.1 km || 
|-id=214 bgcolor=#E9E9E9
| 576214 ||  || — || April 27, 2012 || Haleakala || Pan-STARRS ||  || align=right | 1.1 km || 
|-id=215 bgcolor=#fefefe
| 576215 ||  || — || February 13, 2015 || Haleakala || Pan-STARRS ||  || align=right data-sort-value="0.68" | 680 m || 
|-id=216 bgcolor=#E9E9E9
| 576216 ||  || — || April 29, 2012 || Mount Lemmon || Mount Lemmon Survey ||  || align=right | 1.5 km || 
|-id=217 bgcolor=#E9E9E9
| 576217 ||  || — || April 30, 2012 || Kitt Peak || Spacewatch ||  || align=right data-sort-value="0.80" | 800 m || 
|-id=218 bgcolor=#E9E9E9
| 576218 ||  || — || April 20, 2012 || Kitt Peak || Spacewatch ||  || align=right data-sort-value="0.70" | 700 m || 
|-id=219 bgcolor=#E9E9E9
| 576219 ||  || — || April 16, 2012 || Haleakala || Pan-STARRS ||  || align=right data-sort-value="0.80" | 800 m || 
|-id=220 bgcolor=#E9E9E9
| 576220 ||  || — || April 27, 2012 || Kitt Peak || Spacewatch ||  || align=right | 1.5 km || 
|-id=221 bgcolor=#E9E9E9
| 576221 ||  || — || March 29, 2012 || Kitt Peak || Spacewatch ||  || align=right | 1.1 km || 
|-id=222 bgcolor=#FA8072
| 576222 ||  || — || May 14, 2012 || Haleakala || Pan-STARRS || H || align=right data-sort-value="0.34" | 340 m || 
|-id=223 bgcolor=#fefefe
| 576223 ||  || — || May 14, 2012 || Haleakala || Pan-STARRS || H || align=right data-sort-value="0.54" | 540 m || 
|-id=224 bgcolor=#E9E9E9
| 576224 ||  || — || April 21, 2012 || Kitt Peak || Spacewatch ||  || align=right data-sort-value="0.95" | 950 m || 
|-id=225 bgcolor=#E9E9E9
| 576225 ||  || — || January 31, 2012 || Haleakala || Pan-STARRS || JUN || align=right data-sort-value="0.99" | 990 m || 
|-id=226 bgcolor=#E9E9E9
| 576226 ||  || — || May 15, 2008 || Mount Lemmon || Mount Lemmon Survey ||  || align=right | 1.3 km || 
|-id=227 bgcolor=#E9E9E9
| 576227 ||  || — || February 21, 2003 || Palomar || NEAT ||  || align=right | 1.4 km || 
|-id=228 bgcolor=#E9E9E9
| 576228 ||  || — || March 20, 2007 || Mount Lemmon || Mount Lemmon Survey ||  || align=right | 1.9 km || 
|-id=229 bgcolor=#E9E9E9
| 576229 ||  || — || April 20, 2012 || Mount Lemmon || Mount Lemmon Survey ||  || align=right | 1.0 km || 
|-id=230 bgcolor=#E9E9E9
| 576230 ||  || — || June 12, 2004 || Kitt Peak || Spacewatch || MAR || align=right | 1.2 km || 
|-id=231 bgcolor=#E9E9E9
| 576231 ||  || — || April 25, 2012 || Mount Lemmon || Mount Lemmon Survey ||  || align=right | 1.0 km || 
|-id=232 bgcolor=#E9E9E9
| 576232 ||  || — || October 12, 2009 || Mount Lemmon || Mount Lemmon Survey ||  || align=right | 2.2 km || 
|-id=233 bgcolor=#E9E9E9
| 576233 ||  || — || February 21, 2007 || Mount Lemmon || Mount Lemmon Survey ||  || align=right | 2.4 km || 
|-id=234 bgcolor=#E9E9E9
| 576234 ||  || — || May 15, 2012 || Haleakala || Pan-STARRS ||  || align=right | 1.0 km || 
|-id=235 bgcolor=#E9E9E9
| 576235 ||  || — || May 15, 2012 || Haleakala || Pan-STARRS ||  || align=right | 1.7 km || 
|-id=236 bgcolor=#E9E9E9
| 576236 ||  || — || November 21, 2005 || Kitt Peak || Spacewatch ||  || align=right | 2.0 km || 
|-id=237 bgcolor=#fefefe
| 576237 ||  || — || March 26, 1995 || Kitt Peak || Spacewatch ||  || align=right data-sort-value="0.65" | 650 m || 
|-id=238 bgcolor=#E9E9E9
| 576238 ||  || — || May 12, 2012 || Mount Lemmon || Mount Lemmon Survey ||  || align=right | 1.8 km || 
|-id=239 bgcolor=#E9E9E9
| 576239 ||  || — || June 13, 2008 || Kitt Peak || Spacewatch ||  || align=right | 1.8 km || 
|-id=240 bgcolor=#E9E9E9
| 576240 ||  || — || July 16, 2004 || Cerro Tololo || Cerro Tololo Obs. ||  || align=right | 1.0 km || 
|-id=241 bgcolor=#E9E9E9
| 576241 ||  || — || May 12, 2012 || Haleakala || Pan-STARRS ||  || align=right | 2.0 km || 
|-id=242 bgcolor=#E9E9E9
| 576242 ||  || — || November 3, 2005 || Kitt Peak || Spacewatch ||  || align=right | 1.8 km || 
|-id=243 bgcolor=#E9E9E9
| 576243 ||  || — || May 15, 2012 || Haleakala || Pan-STARRS ||  || align=right | 1.1 km || 
|-id=244 bgcolor=#E9E9E9
| 576244 ||  || — || January 31, 2012 || Haleakala || Pan-STARRS ||  || align=right | 1.4 km || 
|-id=245 bgcolor=#E9E9E9
| 576245 ||  || — || May 1, 2012 || Mount Lemmon || Mount Lemmon Survey ||  || align=right | 1.2 km || 
|-id=246 bgcolor=#fefefe
| 576246 ||  || — || August 28, 2005 || Kitt Peak || Spacewatch ||  || align=right data-sort-value="0.71" | 710 m || 
|-id=247 bgcolor=#E9E9E9
| 576247 ||  || — || May 15, 2012 || Kitt Peak || Spacewatch ||  || align=right | 1.6 km || 
|-id=248 bgcolor=#E9E9E9
| 576248 ||  || — || May 15, 2012 || Haleakala || Pan-STARRS ||  || align=right data-sort-value="0.83" | 830 m || 
|-id=249 bgcolor=#fefefe
| 576249 ||  || — || May 12, 2012 || Mount Lemmon || Mount Lemmon Survey ||  || align=right data-sort-value="0.71" | 710 m || 
|-id=250 bgcolor=#fefefe
| 576250 ||  || — || November 8, 2010 || Mount Lemmon || Mount Lemmon Survey ||  || align=right data-sort-value="0.94" | 940 m || 
|-id=251 bgcolor=#E9E9E9
| 576251 ||  || — || May 12, 2012 || Mount Lemmon || Mount Lemmon Survey ||  || align=right | 1.4 km || 
|-id=252 bgcolor=#E9E9E9
| 576252 ||  || — || May 12, 2012 || Mount Lemmon || Mount Lemmon Survey ||  || align=right | 1.5 km || 
|-id=253 bgcolor=#E9E9E9
| 576253 ||  || — || April 14, 1999 || Kitt Peak || Spacewatch ||  || align=right | 1.1 km || 
|-id=254 bgcolor=#E9E9E9
| 576254 ||  || — || May 14, 2012 || Mount Lemmon || Mount Lemmon Survey ||  || align=right | 1.5 km || 
|-id=255 bgcolor=#fefefe
| 576255 ||  || — || April 24, 2012 || Mount Lemmon || Mount Lemmon Survey ||  || align=right data-sort-value="0.79" | 790 m || 
|-id=256 bgcolor=#C2E0FF
| 576256 ||  || — || May 21, 2015 || Cerro Tololo-DECam || CTIO-DECam || twotino || align=right | 350 km || 
|-id=257 bgcolor=#C2E0FF
| 576257 ||  || — || April 14, 2012 || Haleakala || Pan-STARRS || plutino || align=right | 102 km || 
|-id=258 bgcolor=#E9E9E9
| 576258 ||  || — || May 12, 2012 || Haleakala || Pan-STARRS ||  || align=right data-sort-value="0.94" | 940 m || 
|-id=259 bgcolor=#E9E9E9
| 576259 ||  || — || May 15, 2012 || Kitt Peak || Spacewatch ||  || align=right data-sort-value="0.96" | 960 m || 
|-id=260 bgcolor=#d6d6d6
| 576260 ||  || — || May 15, 2012 || Mount Lemmon || Mount Lemmon Survey ||  || align=right | 2.5 km || 
|-id=261 bgcolor=#fefefe
| 576261 ||  || — || April 25, 2012 || Kitt Peak || Spacewatch || H || align=right data-sort-value="0.57" | 570 m || 
|-id=262 bgcolor=#E9E9E9
| 576262 ||  || — || August 21, 2004 || Siding Spring || SSS ||  || align=right | 2.1 km || 
|-id=263 bgcolor=#E9E9E9
| 576263 ||  || — || May 17, 2012 || Mount Lemmon || Mount Lemmon Survey ||  || align=right | 1.2 km || 
|-id=264 bgcolor=#E9E9E9
| 576264 ||  || — || April 21, 2012 || Mount Lemmon || Mount Lemmon Survey ||  || align=right | 1.9 km || 
|-id=265 bgcolor=#E9E9E9
| 576265 ||  || — || November 6, 2005 || Kitt Peak || Spacewatch ||  || align=right data-sort-value="0.97" | 970 m || 
|-id=266 bgcolor=#E9E9E9
| 576266 ||  || — || April 21, 2012 || Mount Lemmon || Mount Lemmon Survey ||  || align=right | 1.1 km || 
|-id=267 bgcolor=#E9E9E9
| 576267 ||  || — || May 16, 2012 || Mount Lemmon || Mount Lemmon Survey ||  || align=right | 1.7 km || 
|-id=268 bgcolor=#fefefe
| 576268 ||  || — || February 5, 2009 || Mount Lemmon || Mount Lemmon Survey || H || align=right data-sort-value="0.64" | 640 m || 
|-id=269 bgcolor=#E9E9E9
| 576269 ||  || — || April 27, 2012 || Haleakala || Pan-STARRS ||  || align=right data-sort-value="0.77" | 770 m || 
|-id=270 bgcolor=#E9E9E9
| 576270 ||  || — || April 28, 2012 || Mount Lemmon || Mount Lemmon Survey ||  || align=right data-sort-value="0.94" | 940 m || 
|-id=271 bgcolor=#E9E9E9
| 576271 ||  || — || October 27, 2005 || Kitt Peak || Spacewatch ||  || align=right data-sort-value="0.69" | 690 m || 
|-id=272 bgcolor=#E9E9E9
| 576272 ||  || — || May 27, 2008 || Mount Lemmon || Mount Lemmon Survey ||  || align=right data-sort-value="0.68" | 680 m || 
|-id=273 bgcolor=#E9E9E9
| 576273 ||  || — || November 8, 2009 || Mount Lemmon || Mount Lemmon Survey ||  || align=right | 1.5 km || 
|-id=274 bgcolor=#E9E9E9
| 576274 ||  || — || June 3, 2008 || Mount Lemmon || Mount Lemmon Survey ||  || align=right data-sort-value="0.83" | 830 m || 
|-id=275 bgcolor=#E9E9E9
| 576275 ||  || — || May 19, 2012 || Mount Lemmon || Mount Lemmon Survey ||  || align=right | 1.3 km || 
|-id=276 bgcolor=#E9E9E9
| 576276 ||  || — || October 18, 2009 || Mount Lemmon || Mount Lemmon Survey ||  || align=right | 1.8 km || 
|-id=277 bgcolor=#E9E9E9
| 576277 ||  || — || February 25, 2007 || Mount Lemmon || Mount Lemmon Survey ||  || align=right | 1.4 km || 
|-id=278 bgcolor=#E9E9E9
| 576278 ||  || — || March 8, 2016 || Haleakala || Pan-STARRS ||  || align=right | 1.4 km || 
|-id=279 bgcolor=#E9E9E9
| 576279 ||  || — || May 19, 2012 || Piszkesteto || K. Sárneczky ||  || align=right | 1.6 km || 
|-id=280 bgcolor=#fefefe
| 576280 ||  || — || May 19, 2012 || Piszkesteto || K. Sárneczky ||  || align=right data-sort-value="0.74" | 740 m || 
|-id=281 bgcolor=#E9E9E9
| 576281 ||  || — || December 2, 2010 || Kitt Peak || Spacewatch ||  || align=right | 1.6 km || 
|-id=282 bgcolor=#E9E9E9
| 576282 ||  || — || August 22, 2004 || Kitt Peak || Spacewatch ||  || align=right | 1.5 km || 
|-id=283 bgcolor=#E9E9E9
| 576283 ||  || — || May 21, 2012 || Haleakala || Pan-STARRS ||  || align=right data-sort-value="0.81" | 810 m || 
|-id=284 bgcolor=#E9E9E9
| 576284 ||  || — || May 21, 2012 || Haleakala || Pan-STARRS ||  || align=right | 1.3 km || 
|-id=285 bgcolor=#E9E9E9
| 576285 ||  || — || January 21, 2015 || Haleakala || Pan-STARRS ||  || align=right | 1.0 km || 
|-id=286 bgcolor=#E9E9E9
| 576286 ||  || — || October 29, 2014 || Haleakala || Pan-STARRS ||  || align=right | 1.1 km || 
|-id=287 bgcolor=#fefefe
| 576287 ||  || — || December 3, 2013 || Haleakala || Pan-STARRS || H || align=right data-sort-value="0.54" | 540 m || 
|-id=288 bgcolor=#fefefe
| 576288 ||  || — || September 17, 2013 || Mount Lemmon || Mount Lemmon Survey || H || align=right data-sort-value="0.52" | 520 m || 
|-id=289 bgcolor=#E9E9E9
| 576289 ||  || — || September 26, 2017 || Haleakala || Pan-STARRS ||  || align=right | 1.2 km || 
|-id=290 bgcolor=#E9E9E9
| 576290 ||  || — || July 16, 2004 || Cerro Tololo || Cerro Tololo Obs. ||  || align=right | 1.0 km || 
|-id=291 bgcolor=#d6d6d6
| 576291 ||  || — || October 10, 2008 || Mount Lemmon || Mount Lemmon Survey ||  || align=right | 3.6 km || 
|-id=292 bgcolor=#E9E9E9
| 576292 ||  || — || March 31, 2003 || Kitt Peak || Spacewatch ||  || align=right | 1.4 km || 
|-id=293 bgcolor=#E9E9E9
| 576293 ||  || — || November 15, 2009 || Hibiscus || N. Teamo || MAR || align=right data-sort-value="0.95" | 950 m || 
|-id=294 bgcolor=#E9E9E9
| 576294 ||  || — || May 19, 2012 || Kitt Peak || Spacewatch ||  || align=right | 1.0 km || 
|-id=295 bgcolor=#d6d6d6
| 576295 ||  || — || May 25, 2012 || ESA OGS || ESA OGS || 3:2 || align=right | 4.2 km || 
|-id=296 bgcolor=#E9E9E9
| 576296 ||  || — || March 6, 2003 || Palomar || NEAT ||  || align=right | 1.9 km || 
|-id=297 bgcolor=#E9E9E9
| 576297 ||  || — || May 16, 2012 || Haleakala || Pan-STARRS ||  || align=right | 1.3 km || 
|-id=298 bgcolor=#E9E9E9
| 576298 ||  || — || April 27, 2012 || Mount Lemmon || Mount Lemmon Survey ||  || align=right data-sort-value="0.93" | 930 m || 
|-id=299 bgcolor=#E9E9E9
| 576299 ||  || — || September 9, 2004 || Apache Point || J. C. Barentine ||  || align=right | 1.1 km || 
|-id=300 bgcolor=#E9E9E9
| 576300 ||  || — || May 22, 2012 || Mount Lemmon || Mount Lemmon Survey ||  || align=right | 1.9 km || 
|}

576301–576400 

|-bgcolor=#E9E9E9
| 576301 ||  || — || June 9, 2012 || Mount Lemmon || Mount Lemmon Survey ||  || align=right | 1.1 km || 
|-id=302 bgcolor=#E9E9E9
| 576302 ||  || — || June 10, 2012 || Haleakala || Pan-STARRS ||  || align=right | 1.6 km || 
|-id=303 bgcolor=#E9E9E9
| 576303 ||  || — || June 14, 2012 || Mount Lemmon || Mount Lemmon Survey ||  || align=right | 1.1 km || 
|-id=304 bgcolor=#E9E9E9
| 576304 ||  || — || February 21, 2003 || Palomar || NEAT ||  || align=right | 1.6 km || 
|-id=305 bgcolor=#E9E9E9
| 576305 ||  || — || April 9, 2003 || Kitt Peak || Spacewatch ||  || align=right | 1.3 km || 
|-id=306 bgcolor=#E9E9E9
| 576306 ||  || — || November 9, 2013 || Nogales || M. Schwartz, P. R. Holvorcem ||  || align=right | 1.7 km || 
|-id=307 bgcolor=#E9E9E9
| 576307 ||  || — || October 13, 2013 || Mount Lemmon || Mount Lemmon Survey ||  || align=right data-sort-value="0.74" | 740 m || 
|-id=308 bgcolor=#E9E9E9
| 576308 ||  || — || June 14, 2012 || Mount Lemmon || Mount Lemmon Survey ||  || align=right | 1.4 km || 
|-id=309 bgcolor=#fefefe
| 576309 ||  || — || June 30, 2005 || Kitt Peak || Spacewatch ||  || align=right data-sort-value="0.75" | 750 m || 
|-id=310 bgcolor=#fefefe
| 576310 ||  || — || January 21, 2015 || Haleakala || Pan-STARRS ||  || align=right data-sort-value="0.71" | 710 m || 
|-id=311 bgcolor=#E9E9E9
| 576311 ||  || — || May 30, 2016 || Haleakala || Pan-STARRS ||  || align=right | 1.5 km || 
|-id=312 bgcolor=#E9E9E9
| 576312 ||  || — || June 16, 2012 || Mount Lemmon || Mount Lemmon Survey ||  || align=right data-sort-value="0.88" | 880 m || 
|-id=313 bgcolor=#E9E9E9
| 576313 ||  || — || June 17, 2012 || Piszkesteto || K. Sárneczky ||  || align=right | 2.3 km || 
|-id=314 bgcolor=#E9E9E9
| 576314 ||  || — || May 21, 2012 || Haleakala || Pan-STARRS ||  || align=right | 1.4 km || 
|-id=315 bgcolor=#E9E9E9
| 576315 ||  || — || September 6, 2004 || Palomar || NEAT ||  || align=right | 2.2 km || 
|-id=316 bgcolor=#E9E9E9
| 576316 ||  || — || September 3, 2005 || Palomar || NEAT ||  || align=right | 1.0 km || 
|-id=317 bgcolor=#E9E9E9
| 576317 ||  || — || June 16, 2012 || Haleakala || Pan-STARRS ||  || align=right | 1.7 km || 
|-id=318 bgcolor=#E9E9E9
| 576318 ||  || — || May 21, 2012 || Haleakala || Pan-STARRS || EUN || align=right | 1.8 km || 
|-id=319 bgcolor=#E9E9E9
| 576319 ||  || — || June 16, 2012 || Mount Lemmon || Mount Lemmon Survey ||  || align=right | 1.3 km || 
|-id=320 bgcolor=#E9E9E9
| 576320 ||  || — || December 2, 2005 || Mount Lemmon || Mount Lemmon Survey ||  || align=right | 2.2 km || 
|-id=321 bgcolor=#E9E9E9
| 576321 ||  || — || May 28, 2012 || Mount Lemmon || Mount Lemmon Survey ||  || align=right | 1.7 km || 
|-id=322 bgcolor=#E9E9E9
| 576322 ||  || — || October 29, 2008 || Mount Lemmon || Mount Lemmon Survey ||  || align=right | 2.2 km || 
|-id=323 bgcolor=#E9E9E9
| 576323 ||  || — || June 19, 2012 || ESA OGS || ESA OGS ||  || align=right | 1.9 km || 
|-id=324 bgcolor=#E9E9E9
| 576324 ||  || — || June 21, 2012 || Mount Lemmon || Mount Lemmon Survey ||  || align=right data-sort-value="0.86" | 860 m || 
|-id=325 bgcolor=#fefefe
| 576325 ||  || — || May 28, 2012 || Mount Lemmon || Mount Lemmon Survey || H || align=right data-sort-value="0.86" | 860 m || 
|-id=326 bgcolor=#E9E9E9
| 576326 ||  || — || April 25, 2007 || Mount Lemmon || Mount Lemmon Survey ||  || align=right | 1.8 km || 
|-id=327 bgcolor=#E9E9E9
| 576327 ||  || — || February 4, 2006 || Kitt Peak || Spacewatch ||  || align=right | 2.6 km || 
|-id=328 bgcolor=#fefefe
| 576328 ||  || — || August 14, 2001 || Haleakala || AMOS || H || align=right data-sort-value="0.68" | 680 m || 
|-id=329 bgcolor=#E9E9E9
| 576329 ||  || — || July 28, 2012 || Haleakala || Pan-STARRS ||  || align=right | 1.8 km || 
|-id=330 bgcolor=#FFC2E0
| 576330 ||  || — || August 6, 2012 || Haleakala || Pan-STARRS || APO || align=right data-sort-value="0.65" | 650 m || 
|-id=331 bgcolor=#E9E9E9
| 576331 ||  || — || August 8, 2012 || Haleakala || Pan-STARRS ||  || align=right | 1.8 km || 
|-id=332 bgcolor=#E9E9E9
| 576332 ||  || — || August 8, 2012 || Haleakala || Pan-STARRS ||  || align=right | 2.3 km || 
|-id=333 bgcolor=#E9E9E9
| 576333 ||  || — || August 8, 2012 || Haleakala || Pan-STARRS ||  || align=right | 1.5 km || 
|-id=334 bgcolor=#E9E9E9
| 576334 ||  || — || August 8, 2012 || Haleakala || Pan-STARRS ||  || align=right | 1.6 km || 
|-id=335 bgcolor=#E9E9E9
| 576335 ||  || — || September 29, 2008 || Mount Lemmon || Mount Lemmon Survey ||  || align=right | 2.3 km || 
|-id=336 bgcolor=#E9E9E9
| 576336 ||  || — || September 29, 2003 || Kitt Peak || Spacewatch ||  || align=right | 1.3 km || 
|-id=337 bgcolor=#E9E9E9
| 576337 ||  || — || September 25, 2008 || Kitt Peak || Spacewatch ||  || align=right | 2.0 km || 
|-id=338 bgcolor=#E9E9E9
| 576338 ||  || — || August 10, 2012 || Kitt Peak || Spacewatch ||  || align=right | 1.9 km || 
|-id=339 bgcolor=#E9E9E9
| 576339 ||  || — || September 19, 2003 || Kitt Peak || Spacewatch ||  || align=right | 2.0 km || 
|-id=340 bgcolor=#E9E9E9
| 576340 ||  || — || October 21, 2003 || Palomar || NEAT ||  || align=right | 2.9 km || 
|-id=341 bgcolor=#E9E9E9
| 576341 ||  || — || November 3, 2008 || Catalina || CSS ||  || align=right | 1.7 km || 
|-id=342 bgcolor=#E9E9E9
| 576342 ||  || — || September 17, 2003 || Kitt Peak || Spacewatch || MRX || align=right data-sort-value="0.83" | 830 m || 
|-id=343 bgcolor=#E9E9E9
| 576343 ||  || — || September 21, 2003 || Kitt Peak || Spacewatch || GEF || align=right | 1.2 km || 
|-id=344 bgcolor=#E9E9E9
| 576344 ||  || — || October 25, 2003 || Kitt Peak || Spacewatch ||  || align=right | 1.9 km || 
|-id=345 bgcolor=#E9E9E9
| 576345 ||  || — || August 11, 2012 || Tivoli || G. Lehmann, A. Knöfel ||  || align=right | 1.1 km || 
|-id=346 bgcolor=#d6d6d6
| 576346 ||  || — || September 24, 2007 || Kitt Peak || Spacewatch ||  || align=right | 2.5 km || 
|-id=347 bgcolor=#E9E9E9
| 576347 ||  || — || August 13, 2012 || Haleakala || Pan-STARRS ||  || align=right | 2.0 km || 
|-id=348 bgcolor=#E9E9E9
| 576348 ||  || — || October 27, 2003 || Anderson Mesa || LONEOS ||  || align=right | 2.9 km || 
|-id=349 bgcolor=#E9E9E9
| 576349 ||  || — || August 28, 2003 || Palomar || NEAT ||  || align=right | 1.7 km || 
|-id=350 bgcolor=#E9E9E9
| 576350 ||  || — || August 8, 2012 || Haleakala || Pan-STARRS ||  || align=right | 1.5 km || 
|-id=351 bgcolor=#E9E9E9
| 576351 ||  || — || October 7, 2005 || Mauna Kea || Mauna Kea Obs. ||  || align=right | 1.7 km || 
|-id=352 bgcolor=#E9E9E9
| 576352 ||  || — || October 24, 2005 || Mauna Kea || Mauna Kea Obs. ||  || align=right | 1.5 km || 
|-id=353 bgcolor=#d6d6d6
| 576353 ||  || — || June 14, 2007 || Kitt Peak || Spacewatch ||  || align=right | 2.5 km || 
|-id=354 bgcolor=#E9E9E9
| 576354 ||  || — || September 30, 2003 || Kitt Peak || Spacewatch ||  || align=right | 2.0 km || 
|-id=355 bgcolor=#d6d6d6
| 576355 ||  || — || November 19, 2008 || Kitt Peak || Spacewatch ||  || align=right | 2.5 km || 
|-id=356 bgcolor=#E9E9E9
| 576356 ||  || — || August 13, 2012 || Haleakala || Pan-STARRS ||  || align=right | 2.3 km || 
|-id=357 bgcolor=#C7FF8F
| 576357 ||  || — || August 6, 2012 || Haleakala || Pan-STARRS || centaurcritical || align=right | 55 km || 
|-id=358 bgcolor=#d6d6d6
| 576358 ||  || — || February 4, 2000 || Kitt Peak || Spacewatch || 3:2 || align=right | 4.9 km || 
|-id=359 bgcolor=#E9E9E9
| 576359 ||  || — || December 7, 2013 || Haleakala || Pan-STARRS ||  || align=right | 1.6 km || 
|-id=360 bgcolor=#fefefe
| 576360 ||  || — || September 18, 2015 || Mount Lemmon || Mount Lemmon Survey || H || align=right data-sort-value="0.54" | 540 m || 
|-id=361 bgcolor=#E9E9E9
| 576361 ||  || — || February 20, 2006 || Kitt Peak || Spacewatch ||  || align=right | 2.0 km || 
|-id=362 bgcolor=#E9E9E9
| 576362 ||  || — || September 26, 2003 || Palomar || NEAT ||  || align=right | 2.1 km || 
|-id=363 bgcolor=#d6d6d6
| 576363 ||  || — || November 14, 2013 || Mount Lemmon || Mount Lemmon Survey ||  || align=right | 2.8 km || 
|-id=364 bgcolor=#d6d6d6
| 576364 ||  || — || July 25, 2017 || Haleakala || Pan-STARRS ||  || align=right | 1.8 km || 
|-id=365 bgcolor=#C2FFFF
| 576365 ||  || — || August 14, 2012 || Haleakala || Pan-STARRS || L5 || align=right | 8.4 km || 
|-id=366 bgcolor=#d6d6d6
| 576366 ||  || — || August 14, 2012 || Siding Spring || SSS ||  || align=right | 2.4 km || 
|-id=367 bgcolor=#E9E9E9
| 576367 ||  || — || August 13, 2012 || Kitt Peak || Spacewatch ||  || align=right | 2.2 km || 
|-id=368 bgcolor=#C2FFFF
| 576368 ||  || — || August 13, 2012 || Haleakala || Pan-STARRS || L5 || align=right | 9.7 km || 
|-id=369 bgcolor=#E9E9E9
| 576369 ||  || — || August 13, 2012 || Haleakala || Pan-STARRS ||  || align=right | 1.7 km || 
|-id=370 bgcolor=#E9E9E9
| 576370 ||  || — || August 13, 2012 || Haleakala || Pan-STARRS ||  || align=right | 1.9 km || 
|-id=371 bgcolor=#E9E9E9
| 576371 ||  || — || August 11, 2012 || Mayhill-ISON || L. Elenin ||  || align=right | 1.9 km || 
|-id=372 bgcolor=#E9E9E9
| 576372 ||  || — || February 16, 2010 || Kitt Peak || Spacewatch ||  || align=right | 1.8 km || 
|-id=373 bgcolor=#E9E9E9
| 576373 Wolfgangbusch ||  ||  || August 16, 2012 || ESA OGS || ESA OGS ||  || align=right | 1.7 km || 
|-id=374 bgcolor=#d6d6d6
| 576374 ||  || — || August 13, 2012 || Haleakala || Pan-STARRS ||  || align=right | 2.0 km || 
|-id=375 bgcolor=#E9E9E9
| 576375 ||  || — || November 2, 2008 || Mount Lemmon || Mount Lemmon Survey ||  || align=right | 1.9 km || 
|-id=376 bgcolor=#E9E9E9
| 576376 ||  || — || September 17, 2003 || Palomar || NEAT ||  || align=right | 2.4 km || 
|-id=377 bgcolor=#d6d6d6
| 576377 ||  || — || November 1, 2008 || Mount Lemmon || Mount Lemmon Survey ||  || align=right | 2.4 km || 
|-id=378 bgcolor=#E9E9E9
| 576378 ||  || — || September 30, 2003 || Kitt Peak || Spacewatch ||  || align=right | 1.7 km || 
|-id=379 bgcolor=#C2FFFF
| 576379 ||  || — || August 21, 2012 || Haleakala || Pan-STARRS || L5 || align=right | 10 km || 
|-id=380 bgcolor=#E9E9E9
| 576380 ||  || — || September 3, 2003 || Haleakala || AMOS ||  || align=right | 2.3 km || 
|-id=381 bgcolor=#E9E9E9
| 576381 ||  || — || August 17, 2012 || Haleakala || Pan-STARRS ||  || align=right | 1.6 km || 
|-id=382 bgcolor=#E9E9E9
| 576382 ||  || — || February 2, 2005 || Kitt Peak || Spacewatch ||  || align=right | 2.3 km || 
|-id=383 bgcolor=#E9E9E9
| 576383 ||  || — || February 13, 2002 || Kitt Peak || Spacewatch ||  || align=right | 1.8 km || 
|-id=384 bgcolor=#E9E9E9
| 576384 ||  || — || May 2, 2006 || Mount Lemmon || Mount Lemmon Survey ||  || align=right | 1.8 km || 
|-id=385 bgcolor=#d6d6d6
| 576385 ||  || — || October 4, 2002 || Palomar || NEAT ||  || align=right | 1.9 km || 
|-id=386 bgcolor=#E9E9E9
| 576386 ||  || — || October 20, 2003 || Kitt Peak || Spacewatch ||  || align=right | 1.9 km || 
|-id=387 bgcolor=#E9E9E9
| 576387 ||  || — || September 20, 2003 || Kitt Peak || Spacewatch ||  || align=right | 2.0 km || 
|-id=388 bgcolor=#E9E9E9
| 576388 ||  || — || November 19, 2003 || Kitt Peak || Spacewatch ||  || align=right | 2.5 km || 
|-id=389 bgcolor=#E9E9E9
| 576389 ||  || — || September 27, 2008 || Mount Lemmon || Mount Lemmon Survey ||  || align=right | 1.7 km || 
|-id=390 bgcolor=#d6d6d6
| 576390 ||  || — || November 9, 2007 || Catalina || CSS ||  || align=right | 3.4 km || 
|-id=391 bgcolor=#E9E9E9
| 576391 ||  || — || December 19, 2009 || Mount Lemmon || Mount Lemmon Survey ||  || align=right | 2.4 km || 
|-id=392 bgcolor=#E9E9E9
| 576392 ||  || — || January 19, 2005 || Kitt Peak || Spacewatch || AGN || align=right | 1.6 km || 
|-id=393 bgcolor=#E9E9E9
| 576393 ||  || — || August 24, 2003 || Cerro Tololo || Cerro Tololo Obs. ||  || align=right | 1.5 km || 
|-id=394 bgcolor=#E9E9E9
| 576394 ||  || — || August 10, 2012 || Kitt Peak || Spacewatch ||  || align=right | 1.9 km || 
|-id=395 bgcolor=#d6d6d6
| 576395 ||  || — || September 12, 2007 || Mount Lemmon || Mount Lemmon Survey ||  || align=right | 2.2 km || 
|-id=396 bgcolor=#d6d6d6
| 576396 ||  || — || September 13, 2007 || Kitt Peak || Spacewatch ||  || align=right | 2.5 km || 
|-id=397 bgcolor=#E9E9E9
| 576397 ||  || — || July 23, 2003 || Palomar || NEAT ||  || align=right | 1.8 km || 
|-id=398 bgcolor=#E9E9E9
| 576398 ||  || — || August 25, 2012 || Kitt Peak || Spacewatch ||  || align=right | 2.3 km || 
|-id=399 bgcolor=#E9E9E9
| 576399 ||  || — || November 27, 2013 || Haleakala || Pan-STARRS ||  || align=right | 1.6 km || 
|-id=400 bgcolor=#C2FFFF
| 576400 ||  || — || August 25, 2012 || Haleakala || Pan-STARRS || L5 || align=right | 8.6 km || 
|}

576401–576500 

|-bgcolor=#E9E9E9
| 576401 ||  || — || January 3, 2014 || Mount Lemmon || Mount Lemmon Survey ||  || align=right | 1.5 km || 
|-id=402 bgcolor=#d6d6d6
| 576402 ||  || — || August 26, 2012 || Haleakala || Pan-STARRS ||  || align=right | 2.5 km || 
|-id=403 bgcolor=#E9E9E9
| 576403 ||  || — || December 7, 2013 || Kitt Peak || Spacewatch ||  || align=right | 1.8 km || 
|-id=404 bgcolor=#E9E9E9
| 576404 ||  || — || August 26, 2012 || Haleakala || Pan-STARRS ||  || align=right | 1.5 km || 
|-id=405 bgcolor=#E9E9E9
| 576405 ||  || — || February 17, 2015 || Haleakala || Pan-STARRS ||  || align=right | 1.6 km || 
|-id=406 bgcolor=#d6d6d6
| 576406 ||  || — || August 26, 2012 || Haleakala || Pan-STARRS ||  || align=right | 2.4 km || 
|-id=407 bgcolor=#E9E9E9
| 576407 ||  || — || August 25, 2012 || Mount Lemmon || Mount Lemmon Survey ||  || align=right | 1.5 km || 
|-id=408 bgcolor=#E9E9E9
| 576408 ||  || — || September 8, 2012 || Modra || Š. Gajdoš, J. Világi ||  || align=right | 2.0 km || 
|-id=409 bgcolor=#E9E9E9
| 576409 ||  || — || September 21, 2003 || Palomar || NEAT ||  || align=right | 2.0 km || 
|-id=410 bgcolor=#E9E9E9
| 576410 ||  || — || August 29, 2003 || Haleakala || AMOS ||  || align=right | 3.1 km || 
|-id=411 bgcolor=#E9E9E9
| 576411 ||  || — || September 14, 2012 || Catalina || CSS ||  || align=right | 2.0 km || 
|-id=412 bgcolor=#fefefe
| 576412 ||  || — || September 15, 2012 || Mount Lemmon || Mount Lemmon Survey ||  || align=right data-sort-value="0.86" | 860 m || 
|-id=413 bgcolor=#E9E9E9
| 576413 ||  || — || January 25, 2009 || Catalina || CSS ||  || align=right | 2.7 km || 
|-id=414 bgcolor=#E9E9E9
| 576414 ||  || — || October 21, 2003 || Palomar || NEAT || DOR || align=right | 2.4 km || 
|-id=415 bgcolor=#E9E9E9
| 576415 ||  || — || September 14, 2012 || Kitt Peak || Spacewatch ||  || align=right | 2.0 km || 
|-id=416 bgcolor=#E9E9E9
| 576416 ||  || — || October 18, 2003 || Kitt Peak || Spacewatch ||  || align=right | 2.5 km || 
|-id=417 bgcolor=#E9E9E9
| 576417 ||  || — || September 14, 2012 || ESA OGS || ESA OGS ||  || align=right | 2.2 km || 
|-id=418 bgcolor=#d6d6d6
| 576418 ||  || — || August 23, 2007 || Kitt Peak || Spacewatch ||  || align=right | 2.4 km || 
|-id=419 bgcolor=#E9E9E9
| 576419 ||  || — || September 21, 2003 || Kitt Peak || Spacewatch ||  || align=right | 2.4 km || 
|-id=420 bgcolor=#E9E9E9
| 576420 ||  || — || September 6, 2012 || Mount Lemmon || Mount Lemmon Survey ||  || align=right | 2.2 km || 
|-id=421 bgcolor=#E9E9E9
| 576421 ||  || — || April 29, 2011 || Mount Lemmon || Mount Lemmon Survey ||  || align=right | 2.1 km || 
|-id=422 bgcolor=#d6d6d6
| 576422 ||  || — || October 18, 2007 || Kitt Peak || Spacewatch ||  || align=right | 2.5 km || 
|-id=423 bgcolor=#E9E9E9
| 576423 ||  || — || August 29, 2003 || Haleakala || AMOS ||  || align=right | 3.0 km || 
|-id=424 bgcolor=#E9E9E9
| 576424 ||  || — || September 15, 2012 || Catalina || CSS ||  || align=right | 2.0 km || 
|-id=425 bgcolor=#E9E9E9
| 576425 ||  || — || September 15, 2012 || Catalina || CSS ||  || align=right | 2.5 km || 
|-id=426 bgcolor=#E9E9E9
| 576426 ||  || — || November 21, 2003 || Kitt Peak || Spacewatch ||  || align=right | 1.7 km || 
|-id=427 bgcolor=#d6d6d6
| 576427 ||  || — || September 14, 2012 || Mount Lemmon || Mount Lemmon Survey ||  || align=right | 2.9 km || 
|-id=428 bgcolor=#E9E9E9
| 576428 ||  || — || September 16, 2012 || Kitt Peak || Spacewatch ||  || align=right | 2.0 km || 
|-id=429 bgcolor=#E9E9E9
| 576429 ||  || — || August 22, 2003 || Palomar || NEAT ||  || align=right | 2.1 km || 
|-id=430 bgcolor=#C2FFFF
| 576430 ||  || — || January 19, 2005 || Kitt Peak || Spacewatch || L5 || align=right | 12 km || 
|-id=431 bgcolor=#E9E9E9
| 576431 ||  || — || October 28, 2003 || Bergisch Gladbach || W. Bickel ||  || align=right | 2.0 km || 
|-id=432 bgcolor=#fefefe
| 576432 ||  || — || October 25, 2005 || Kitt Peak || Spacewatch ||  || align=right data-sort-value="0.65" | 650 m || 
|-id=433 bgcolor=#E9E9E9
| 576433 ||  || — || November 29, 2003 || Junk Bond || D. Healy || AGN || align=right | 1.6 km || 
|-id=434 bgcolor=#E9E9E9
| 576434 ||  || — || September 17, 2012 || Mount Lemmon || Mount Lemmon Survey ||  || align=right | 2.0 km || 
|-id=435 bgcolor=#E9E9E9
| 576435 ||  || — || September 18, 2012 || Wildberg || R. Apitzsch ||  || align=right | 1.8 km || 
|-id=436 bgcolor=#E9E9E9
| 576436 ||  || — || January 18, 2010 || Tzec Maun || D. Chestnov, A. Novichonok ||  || align=right | 3.0 km || 
|-id=437 bgcolor=#d6d6d6
| 576437 ||  || — || September 15, 2002 || Haleakala || AMOS ||  || align=right | 3.8 km || 
|-id=438 bgcolor=#E9E9E9
| 576438 ||  || — || September 16, 2012 || Catalina || CSS ||  || align=right | 2.4 km || 
|-id=439 bgcolor=#fefefe
| 576439 ||  || — || September 17, 2012 || Kitt Peak || Spacewatch ||  || align=right data-sort-value="0.61" | 610 m || 
|-id=440 bgcolor=#E9E9E9
| 576440 ||  || — || November 26, 2003 || Kitt Peak || Spacewatch ||  || align=right | 2.0 km || 
|-id=441 bgcolor=#E9E9E9
| 576441 ||  || — || August 14, 2002 || Kitt Peak || Spacewatch ||  || align=right | 2.4 km || 
|-id=442 bgcolor=#E9E9E9
| 576442 ||  || — || October 31, 2008 || Kitt Peak || Spacewatch ||  || align=right | 1.8 km || 
|-id=443 bgcolor=#d6d6d6
| 576443 ||  || — || October 10, 2007 || Mount Lemmon || Mount Lemmon Survey ||  || align=right | 2.6 km || 
|-id=444 bgcolor=#E9E9E9
| 576444 ||  || — || October 25, 2003 || Kitt Peak || Spacewatch ||  || align=right | 1.8 km || 
|-id=445 bgcolor=#E9E9E9
| 576445 ||  || — || January 19, 2005 || Kitt Peak || Spacewatch ||  || align=right | 2.4 km || 
|-id=446 bgcolor=#d6d6d6
| 576446 ||  || — || March 13, 2005 || Kitt Peak || Spacewatch ||  || align=right | 2.1 km || 
|-id=447 bgcolor=#E9E9E9
| 576447 ||  || — || September 20, 2012 || Mayhill-ISON || L. Elenin ||  || align=right | 1.9 km || 
|-id=448 bgcolor=#E9E9E9
| 576448 ||  || — || October 18, 2003 || Kitt Peak || Spacewatch ||  || align=right | 2.3 km || 
|-id=449 bgcolor=#d6d6d6
| 576449 ||  || — || September 18, 2012 || Mount Lemmon || Mount Lemmon Survey ||  || align=right | 2.0 km || 
|-id=450 bgcolor=#E9E9E9
| 576450 ||  || — || April 9, 2006 || Kitt Peak || Spacewatch ||  || align=right | 2.0 km || 
|-id=451 bgcolor=#E9E9E9
| 576451 ||  || — || August 26, 2012 || Haleakala || Pan-STARRS ||  || align=right | 1.6 km || 
|-id=452 bgcolor=#fefefe
| 576452 ||  || — || September 18, 2012 || Mount Lemmon || Mount Lemmon Survey ||  || align=right data-sort-value="0.56" | 560 m || 
|-id=453 bgcolor=#d6d6d6
| 576453 ||  || — || September 18, 2012 || Mount Lemmon || Mount Lemmon Survey ||  || align=right | 1.6 km || 
|-id=454 bgcolor=#E9E9E9
| 576454 ||  || — || August 26, 2012 || Haleakala || Pan-STARRS ||  || align=right | 1.7 km || 
|-id=455 bgcolor=#d6d6d6
| 576455 ||  || — || March 1, 2009 || Mount Lemmon || Mount Lemmon Survey ||  || align=right | 2.9 km || 
|-id=456 bgcolor=#E9E9E9
| 576456 ||  || — || May 1, 2006 || Mauna Kea || Mauna Kea Obs. ||  || align=right | 1.4 km || 
|-id=457 bgcolor=#E9E9E9
| 576457 ||  || — || September 18, 2012 || Mount Lemmon || Mount Lemmon Survey ||  || align=right | 1.9 km || 
|-id=458 bgcolor=#E9E9E9
| 576458 ||  || — || November 24, 2008 || Kitt Peak || Spacewatch ||  || align=right | 2.0 km || 
|-id=459 bgcolor=#C2FFFF
| 576459 ||  || — || July 28, 2011 || Haleakala || Pan-STARRS || L5 || align=right | 8.5 km || 
|-id=460 bgcolor=#E9E9E9
| 576460 ||  || — || April 2, 2011 || Kitt Peak || Spacewatch ||  || align=right | 1.8 km || 
|-id=461 bgcolor=#E9E9E9
| 576461 ||  || — || September 17, 2012 || Mount Lemmon || Mount Lemmon Survey ||  || align=right | 2.1 km || 
|-id=462 bgcolor=#d6d6d6
| 576462 ||  || — || March 13, 2010 || Kitt Peak || Spacewatch ||  || align=right | 1.9 km || 
|-id=463 bgcolor=#E9E9E9
| 576463 ||  || — || September 18, 2003 || Kitt Peak || Spacewatch ||  || align=right | 1.7 km || 
|-id=464 bgcolor=#E9E9E9
| 576464 ||  || — || November 21, 2008 || Kitt Peak || Spacewatch ||  || align=right | 2.0 km || 
|-id=465 bgcolor=#E9E9E9
| 576465 ||  || — || September 24, 2012 || Mayhill || N. Falla || HOF || align=right | 2.2 km || 
|-id=466 bgcolor=#E9E9E9
| 576466 ||  || — || September 21, 2012 || Sierra Stars || M. Langbroek ||  || align=right | 2.8 km || 
|-id=467 bgcolor=#E9E9E9
| 576467 ||  || — || August 13, 2012 || Kitt Peak || Spacewatch ||  || align=right | 3.4 km || 
|-id=468 bgcolor=#d6d6d6
| 576468 ||  || — || September 19, 2012 || Mount Lemmon || Mount Lemmon Survey ||  || align=right | 3.1 km || 
|-id=469 bgcolor=#E9E9E9
| 576469 ||  || — || October 23, 2003 || Kitt Peak || Spacewatch ||  || align=right | 1.9 km || 
|-id=470 bgcolor=#fefefe
| 576470 ||  || — || January 27, 2007 || Mount Lemmon || Mount Lemmon Survey ||  || align=right data-sort-value="0.71" | 710 m || 
|-id=471 bgcolor=#E9E9E9
| 576471 ||  || — || November 19, 2003 || Palomar || NEAT ||  || align=right | 1.9 km || 
|-id=472 bgcolor=#E9E9E9
| 576472 ||  || — || September 21, 2003 || Palomar || NEAT ||  || align=right | 3.5 km || 
|-id=473 bgcolor=#E9E9E9
| 576473 ||  || — || January 16, 2005 || Kitt Peak || Spacewatch ||  || align=right | 2.2 km || 
|-id=474 bgcolor=#E9E9E9
| 576474 ||  || — || October 17, 2003 || Kitt Peak || Spacewatch ||  || align=right | 2.0 km || 
|-id=475 bgcolor=#E9E9E9
| 576475 ||  || — || September 17, 2012 || Kitt Peak || Spacewatch ||  || align=right | 2.1 km || 
|-id=476 bgcolor=#E9E9E9
| 576476 ||  || — || October 10, 2008 || Kitt Peak || Spacewatch ||  || align=right data-sort-value="0.75" | 750 m || 
|-id=477 bgcolor=#E9E9E9
| 576477 ||  || — || September 21, 2012 || Kitt Peak || Spacewatch ||  || align=right | 1.6 km || 
|-id=478 bgcolor=#d6d6d6
| 576478 ||  || — || September 27, 2012 || Haleakala || Pan-STARRS ||  || align=right | 2.8 km || 
|-id=479 bgcolor=#C2FFFF
| 576479 ||  || — || November 28, 2014 || Haleakala || Pan-STARRS || L5 || align=right | 9.7 km || 
|-id=480 bgcolor=#E9E9E9
| 576480 ||  || — || March 22, 2015 || Haleakala || Pan-STARRS ||  || align=right | 1.9 km || 
|-id=481 bgcolor=#d6d6d6
| 576481 ||  || — || September 16, 2012 || Kitt Peak || Spacewatch ||  || align=right | 3.4 km || 
|-id=482 bgcolor=#E9E9E9
| 576482 ||  || — || September 19, 2012 || Mount Lemmon || Mount Lemmon Survey ||  || align=right | 1.5 km || 
|-id=483 bgcolor=#d6d6d6
| 576483 ||  || — || January 3, 2014 || Mount Lemmon || Mount Lemmon Survey ||  || align=right | 1.5 km || 
|-id=484 bgcolor=#d6d6d6
| 576484 ||  || — || September 17, 2012 || Kitt Peak || Spacewatch ||  || align=right | 2.1 km || 
|-id=485 bgcolor=#d6d6d6
| 576485 ||  || — || September 25, 2012 || Mount Lemmon || Mount Lemmon Survey ||  || align=right | 2.1 km || 
|-id=486 bgcolor=#E9E9E9
| 576486 ||  || — || September 21, 2012 || Mount Lemmon || Mount Lemmon Survey ||  || align=right | 1.3 km || 
|-id=487 bgcolor=#d6d6d6
| 576487 ||  || — || September 25, 2012 || Mount Lemmon || Mount Lemmon Survey ||  || align=right | 2.2 km || 
|-id=488 bgcolor=#E9E9E9
| 576488 ||  || — || September 17, 2012 || Mount Lemmon || Mount Lemmon Survey ||  || align=right | 1.7 km || 
|-id=489 bgcolor=#E9E9E9
| 576489 ||  || — || September 18, 2012 || Mount Lemmon || Mount Lemmon Survey ||  || align=right | 2.0 km || 
|-id=490 bgcolor=#d6d6d6
| 576490 ||  || — || August 26, 2012 || Kitt Peak || Spacewatch ||  || align=right | 2.8 km || 
|-id=491 bgcolor=#d6d6d6
| 576491 ||  || — || September 22, 2012 || Kitt Peak || Spacewatch ||  || align=right | 1.6 km || 
|-id=492 bgcolor=#d6d6d6
| 576492 ||  || — || September 24, 2012 || Mount Lemmon || Mount Lemmon Survey ||  || align=right | 2.4 km || 
|-id=493 bgcolor=#E9E9E9
| 576493 ||  || — || September 16, 2012 || Catalina || CSS ||  || align=right data-sort-value="0.81" | 810 m || 
|-id=494 bgcolor=#fefefe
| 576494 ||  || — || September 25, 2012 || Mount Lemmon || Mount Lemmon Survey ||  || align=right data-sort-value="0.58" | 580 m || 
|-id=495 bgcolor=#C2FFFF
| 576495 ||  || — || April 28, 2008 || Mount Lemmon || Mount Lemmon Survey || L5 || align=right | 6.8 km || 
|-id=496 bgcolor=#E9E9E9
| 576496 ||  || — || September 23, 2012 || Mount Lemmon || Mount Lemmon Survey ||  || align=right | 1.6 km || 
|-id=497 bgcolor=#C2FFFF
| 576497 ||  || — || October 5, 2012 || Haleakala || Pan-STARRS || L5 || align=right | 8.4 km || 
|-id=498 bgcolor=#E9E9E9
| 576498 ||  || — || September 20, 2003 || Kitt Peak || Spacewatch ||  || align=right | 1.4 km || 
|-id=499 bgcolor=#fefefe
| 576499 ||  || — || October 10, 1999 || Socorro || LINEAR ||  || align=right data-sort-value="0.54" | 540 m || 
|-id=500 bgcolor=#C2FFFF
| 576500 ||  || — || July 13, 2009 || Cerro Burek || Alianza S4 Obs. || L5 || align=right | 13 km || 
|}

576501–576600 

|-bgcolor=#d6d6d6
| 576501 ||  || — || October 5, 2012 || Mount Lemmon || Mount Lemmon Survey ||  || align=right | 1.7 km || 
|-id=502 bgcolor=#E9E9E9
| 576502 ||  || — || September 22, 2012 || Mount Lemmon || T. Vorobjov, A. Kostin ||  || align=right | 2.0 km || 
|-id=503 bgcolor=#E9E9E9
| 576503 ||  || — || September 15, 2012 || Nogales || M. Schwartz, P. R. Holvorcem ||  || align=right | 2.2 km || 
|-id=504 bgcolor=#d6d6d6
| 576504 ||  || — || October 20, 2001 || Palomar || NEAT || ARM || align=right | 3.9 km || 
|-id=505 bgcolor=#E9E9E9
| 576505 ||  || — || October 6, 2012 || Mount Lemmon || Mount Lemmon Survey ||  || align=right | 1.8 km || 
|-id=506 bgcolor=#FA8072
| 576506 ||  || — || September 30, 2005 || Mount Lemmon || Mount Lemmon Survey ||  || align=right data-sort-value="0.49" | 490 m || 
|-id=507 bgcolor=#fefefe
| 576507 ||  || — || September 19, 2001 || Socorro || LINEAR ||  || align=right data-sort-value="0.71" | 710 m || 
|-id=508 bgcolor=#d6d6d6
| 576508 ||  || — || October 21, 2001 || Socorro || LINEAR || LIX || align=right | 3.2 km || 
|-id=509 bgcolor=#E9E9E9
| 576509 ||  || — || September 14, 2012 || Mount Lemmon || Mount Lemmon Survey ||  || align=right | 2.2 km || 
|-id=510 bgcolor=#fefefe
| 576510 ||  || — || September 21, 2012 || Kitt Peak || Spacewatch ||  || align=right data-sort-value="0.65" | 650 m || 
|-id=511 bgcolor=#fefefe
| 576511 ||  || — || September 14, 1999 || Catalina || CSS ||  || align=right data-sort-value="0.75" | 750 m || 
|-id=512 bgcolor=#E9E9E9
| 576512 ||  || — || September 27, 2003 || Kitt Peak || Spacewatch || GEF || align=right data-sort-value="0.93" | 930 m || 
|-id=513 bgcolor=#d6d6d6
| 576513 ||  || — || October 8, 2012 || Mount Lemmon || Mount Lemmon Survey ||  || align=right | 2.5 km || 
|-id=514 bgcolor=#E9E9E9
| 576514 ||  || — || October 8, 2012 || Mount Lemmon || Mount Lemmon Survey ||  || align=right | 2.0 km || 
|-id=515 bgcolor=#E9E9E9
| 576515 ||  || — || February 16, 2010 || Kitt Peak || Spacewatch || AGN || align=right data-sort-value="0.94" | 940 m || 
|-id=516 bgcolor=#d6d6d6
| 576516 ||  || — || September 15, 2012 || ESA OGS || ESA OGS ||  || align=right | 2.1 km || 
|-id=517 bgcolor=#d6d6d6
| 576517 ||  || — || September 14, 2007 || Mount Lemmon || Mount Lemmon Survey || KOR || align=right data-sort-value="0.90" | 900 m || 
|-id=518 bgcolor=#E9E9E9
| 576518 ||  || — || October 8, 2012 || Haleakala || Pan-STARRS ||  || align=right | 1.9 km || 
|-id=519 bgcolor=#C2FFFF
| 576519 ||  || — || September 17, 2012 || Mount Lemmon || Mount Lemmon Survey || L5 || align=right | 7.0 km || 
|-id=520 bgcolor=#E9E9E9
| 576520 ||  || — || March 14, 2010 || Kitt Peak || Spacewatch ||  || align=right | 1.8 km || 
|-id=521 bgcolor=#E9E9E9
| 576521 ||  || — || September 10, 2007 || Mount Lemmon || Mount Lemmon Survey ||  || align=right | 2.2 km || 
|-id=522 bgcolor=#d6d6d6
| 576522 ||  || — || December 21, 2008 || Mount Lemmon || Mount Lemmon Survey ||  || align=right | 2.0 km || 
|-id=523 bgcolor=#E9E9E9
| 576523 ||  || — || September 30, 2003 || Kitt Peak || Spacewatch ||  || align=right | 1.9 km || 
|-id=524 bgcolor=#fefefe
| 576524 ||  || — || September 6, 2008 || Mount Lemmon || Mount Lemmon Survey ||  || align=right data-sort-value="0.65" | 650 m || 
|-id=525 bgcolor=#C2FFFF
| 576525 ||  || — || October 16, 2001 || Kitt Peak || Spacewatch || n.a. || align=right | 9.3 km || 
|-id=526 bgcolor=#E9E9E9
| 576526 ||  || — || September 16, 2012 || Mount Lemmon || Mount Lemmon Survey ||  || align=right | 1.7 km || 
|-id=527 bgcolor=#C2FFFF
| 576527 ||  || — || October 9, 2012 || Mount Lemmon || Mount Lemmon Survey || L5 || align=right | 7.0 km || 
|-id=528 bgcolor=#d6d6d6
| 576528 ||  || — || September 9, 2007 || Kitt Peak || Spacewatch || KOR || align=right | 1.7 km || 
|-id=529 bgcolor=#E9E9E9
| 576529 ||  || — || October 20, 2003 || Kitt Peak || Spacewatch ||  || align=right | 1.8 km || 
|-id=530 bgcolor=#d6d6d6
| 576530 ||  || — || March 20, 2010 || Kitt Peak || Spacewatch ||  || align=right | 1.9 km || 
|-id=531 bgcolor=#d6d6d6
| 576531 ||  || — || October 6, 2012 || Mount Lemmon || Mount Lemmon Survey ||  || align=right | 2.2 km || 
|-id=532 bgcolor=#E9E9E9
| 576532 ||  || — || October 6, 2012 || Mount Lemmon || Mount Lemmon Survey ||  || align=right | 1.8 km || 
|-id=533 bgcolor=#d6d6d6
| 576533 ||  || — || September 15, 2012 || Mount Lemmon || Mount Lemmon Survey ||  || align=right | 2.5 km || 
|-id=534 bgcolor=#E9E9E9
| 576534 ||  || — || September 23, 2012 || Mount Lemmon || Mount Lemmon Survey ||  || align=right | 1.6 km || 
|-id=535 bgcolor=#d6d6d6
| 576535 ||  || — || December 31, 2008 || Mount Lemmon || Mount Lemmon Survey ||  || align=right | 1.9 km || 
|-id=536 bgcolor=#E9E9E9
| 576536 ||  || — || September 6, 2012 || Mount Lemmon || Mount Lemmon Survey ||  || align=right | 2.1 km || 
|-id=537 bgcolor=#E9E9E9
| 576537 ||  || — || October 20, 2003 || Kitt Peak || Spacewatch ||  || align=right | 2.3 km || 
|-id=538 bgcolor=#E9E9E9
| 576538 ||  || — || October 7, 2012 || Haleakala || Pan-STARRS ||  || align=right | 2.0 km || 
|-id=539 bgcolor=#E9E9E9
| 576539 ||  || — || October 7, 2012 || Haleakala || Pan-STARRS ||  || align=right | 1.6 km || 
|-id=540 bgcolor=#E9E9E9
| 576540 ||  || — || September 3, 2007 || Catalina || CSS ||  || align=right | 2.2 km || 
|-id=541 bgcolor=#d6d6d6
| 576541 ||  || — || March 11, 2005 || Kitt Peak || Spacewatch ||  || align=right | 2.6 km || 
|-id=542 bgcolor=#E9E9E9
| 576542 ||  || — || December 5, 2003 || Catalina || CSS || GAL || align=right | 2.0 km || 
|-id=543 bgcolor=#E9E9E9
| 576543 ||  || — || August 28, 2003 || Haleakala || AMOS ||  || align=right | 1.7 km || 
|-id=544 bgcolor=#d6d6d6
| 576544 ||  || — || October 9, 2012 || Mount Lemmon || Mount Lemmon Survey ||  || align=right | 2.4 km || 
|-id=545 bgcolor=#E9E9E9
| 576545 ||  || — || November 16, 2003 || Kitt Peak || Spacewatch ||  || align=right | 2.0 km || 
|-id=546 bgcolor=#E9E9E9
| 576546 ||  || — || October 19, 2003 || Kitt Peak || Spacewatch || AGN || align=right | 1.1 km || 
|-id=547 bgcolor=#E9E9E9
| 576547 ||  || — || September 16, 2012 || Mount Lemmon || Mount Lemmon Survey ||  || align=right data-sort-value="0.82" | 820 m || 
|-id=548 bgcolor=#E9E9E9
| 576548 ||  || — || September 16, 2012 || Mount Lemmon || Mount Lemmon Survey ||  || align=right data-sort-value="0.78" | 780 m || 
|-id=549 bgcolor=#E9E9E9
| 576549 ||  || — || September 3, 2007 || Pla D'Arguines || R. Ferrando, M. Ferrando ||  || align=right | 2.1 km || 
|-id=550 bgcolor=#d6d6d6
| 576550 ||  || — || October 10, 2012 || Mount Lemmon || Mount Lemmon Survey ||  || align=right | 2.4 km || 
|-id=551 bgcolor=#d6d6d6
| 576551 ||  || — || November 3, 2007 || Kitt Peak || Spacewatch ||  || align=right | 2.7 km || 
|-id=552 bgcolor=#E9E9E9
| 576552 ||  || — || October 10, 2012 || Mount Lemmon || Mount Lemmon Survey ||  || align=right | 1.2 km || 
|-id=553 bgcolor=#d6d6d6
| 576553 ||  || — || January 18, 2009 || Mount Lemmon || Mount Lemmon Survey ||  || align=right | 2.2 km || 
|-id=554 bgcolor=#E9E9E9
| 576554 ||  || — || October 10, 2012 || Mount Lemmon || Mount Lemmon Survey ||  || align=right | 2.4 km || 
|-id=555 bgcolor=#d6d6d6
| 576555 ||  || — || September 16, 2012 || Kitt Peak || Spacewatch ||  || align=right | 2.0 km || 
|-id=556 bgcolor=#d6d6d6
| 576556 ||  || — || October 10, 2012 || Mount Lemmon || Mount Lemmon Survey ||  || align=right | 3.4 km || 
|-id=557 bgcolor=#E9E9E9
| 576557 ||  || — || October 6, 2012 || Mount Lemmon || Mount Lemmon Survey ||  || align=right | 2.0 km || 
|-id=558 bgcolor=#fefefe
| 576558 ||  || — || October 9, 1996 || Kitt Peak || Spacewatch || H || align=right data-sort-value="0.39" | 390 m || 
|-id=559 bgcolor=#d6d6d6
| 576559 ||  || — || February 13, 2010 || Kitt Peak || Spacewatch ||  || align=right | 3.1 km || 
|-id=560 bgcolor=#E9E9E9
| 576560 ||  || — || October 19, 2003 || Kitt Peak || Spacewatch || AST || align=right | 1.5 km || 
|-id=561 bgcolor=#E9E9E9
| 576561 ||  || — || October 5, 2012 || Haleakala || Pan-STARRS ||  || align=right | 1.9 km || 
|-id=562 bgcolor=#E9E9E9
| 576562 ||  || — || October 6, 2012 || Haleakala || Pan-STARRS ||  || align=right | 1.9 km || 
|-id=563 bgcolor=#E9E9E9
| 576563 ||  || — || February 22, 2002 || Palomar || NEAT ||  || align=right | 2.1 km || 
|-id=564 bgcolor=#fefefe
| 576564 ||  || — || August 18, 2002 || Palomar || NEAT ||  || align=right data-sort-value="0.68" | 680 m || 
|-id=565 bgcolor=#d6d6d6
| 576565 ||  || — || September 17, 2012 || Mount Lemmon || Mount Lemmon Survey || EOS || align=right | 1.5 km || 
|-id=566 bgcolor=#d6d6d6
| 576566 ||  || — || July 14, 2002 || Palomar || NEAT ||  || align=right | 2.2 km || 
|-id=567 bgcolor=#E9E9E9
| 576567 ||  || — || September 11, 2012 || Siding Spring || SSS ||  || align=right | 2.5 km || 
|-id=568 bgcolor=#E9E9E9
| 576568 ||  || — || November 26, 2003 || Kitt Peak || Spacewatch ||  || align=right | 2.3 km || 
|-id=569 bgcolor=#d6d6d6
| 576569 ||  || — || October 5, 2012 || Mount Lemmon || Mount Lemmon Survey ||  || align=right | 2.1 km || 
|-id=570 bgcolor=#E9E9E9
| 576570 ||  || — || October 5, 2012 || Haleakala || Pan-STARRS ||  || align=right | 1.8 km || 
|-id=571 bgcolor=#fefefe
| 576571 ||  || — || April 6, 2011 || Kitt Peak || Spacewatch ||  || align=right data-sort-value="0.78" | 780 m || 
|-id=572 bgcolor=#E9E9E9
| 576572 ||  || — || October 24, 2003 || Kitt Peak || Spacewatch ||  || align=right | 2.0 km || 
|-id=573 bgcolor=#E9E9E9
| 576573 ||  || — || October 3, 2003 || Kitt Peak || Spacewatch || CLO || align=right | 1.7 km || 
|-id=574 bgcolor=#d6d6d6
| 576574 ||  || — || June 24, 2001 || Kitt Peak || Spacewatch ||  || align=right | 3.4 km || 
|-id=575 bgcolor=#d6d6d6
| 576575 ||  || — || November 20, 2007 || Kitt Peak || Spacewatch ||  || align=right | 2.9 km || 
|-id=576 bgcolor=#E9E9E9
| 576576 ||  || — || October 8, 2012 || Haleakala || Pan-STARRS ||  || align=right | 1.7 km || 
|-id=577 bgcolor=#d6d6d6
| 576577 ||  || — || October 8, 2012 || Haleakala || Pan-STARRS || KOR || align=right | 1.1 km || 
|-id=578 bgcolor=#E9E9E9
| 576578 ||  || — || October 8, 2012 || Mount Lemmon || Mount Lemmon Survey ||  || align=right | 1.9 km || 
|-id=579 bgcolor=#E9E9E9
| 576579 ||  || — || October 8, 2012 || Haleakala || Pan-STARRS ||  || align=right | 1.7 km || 
|-id=580 bgcolor=#d6d6d6
| 576580 ||  || — || April 12, 2004 || Kitt Peak || Spacewatch ||  || align=right | 2.4 km || 
|-id=581 bgcolor=#E9E9E9
| 576581 ||  || — || April 13, 2011 || Mount Lemmon || Mount Lemmon Survey ||  || align=right | 2.2 km || 
|-id=582 bgcolor=#E9E9E9
| 576582 ||  || — || November 16, 2003 || Kitt Peak || Spacewatch || MRX || align=right data-sort-value="0.89" | 890 m || 
|-id=583 bgcolor=#d6d6d6
| 576583 ||  || — || May 31, 2001 || Kitt Peak || Spacewatch ||  || align=right | 2.5 km || 
|-id=584 bgcolor=#E9E9E9
| 576584 ||  || — || October 8, 2012 || Mount Lemmon || Mount Lemmon Survey ||  || align=right | 1.8 km || 
|-id=585 bgcolor=#E9E9E9
| 576585 ||  || — || September 22, 2003 || Palomar || NEAT ||  || align=right | 2.2 km || 
|-id=586 bgcolor=#d6d6d6
| 576586 ||  || — || April 2, 2005 || Mount Lemmon || Mount Lemmon Survey ||  || align=right | 2.2 km || 
|-id=587 bgcolor=#E9E9E9
| 576587 ||  || — || October 10, 2012 || Bergisch Gladbach || W. Bickel ||  || align=right | 2.6 km || 
|-id=588 bgcolor=#fefefe
| 576588 ||  || — || October 11, 2012 || Kitt Peak || Spacewatch ||  || align=right data-sort-value="0.69" | 690 m || 
|-id=589 bgcolor=#d6d6d6
| 576589 ||  || — || March 4, 2005 || Mount Lemmon || Mount Lemmon Survey ||  || align=right | 2.0 km || 
|-id=590 bgcolor=#E9E9E9
| 576590 ||  || — || October 11, 2012 || Mount Lemmon || Mount Lemmon Survey ||  || align=right | 2.3 km || 
|-id=591 bgcolor=#E9E9E9
| 576591 ||  || — || September 26, 2008 || Kitt Peak || Spacewatch ||  || align=right | 1.2 km || 
|-id=592 bgcolor=#d6d6d6
| 576592 ||  || — || September 19, 2012 || Mount Lemmon || Mount Lemmon Survey ||  || align=right | 3.2 km || 
|-id=593 bgcolor=#C2FFFF
| 576593 ||  || — || October 11, 2012 || Mount Lemmon || Mount Lemmon Survey || L5 || align=right | 7.7 km || 
|-id=594 bgcolor=#E9E9E9
| 576594 ||  || — || October 11, 2012 || Mount Lemmon || Mount Lemmon Survey ||  || align=right | 1.6 km || 
|-id=595 bgcolor=#E9E9E9
| 576595 ||  || — || October 11, 2012 || Haleakala || Pan-STARRS ||  || align=right data-sort-value="0.78" | 780 m || 
|-id=596 bgcolor=#E9E9E9
| 576596 ||  || — || October 11, 2012 || Mount Lemmon || Mount Lemmon Survey ||  || align=right | 1.7 km || 
|-id=597 bgcolor=#fefefe
| 576597 ||  || — || October 13, 2012 || Kitt Peak || Spacewatch ||  || align=right data-sort-value="0.54" | 540 m || 
|-id=598 bgcolor=#C2FFFF
| 576598 ||  || — || September 15, 2012 || Kitt Peak || Spacewatch || L5 || align=right | 8.5 km || 
|-id=599 bgcolor=#d6d6d6
| 576599 ||  || — || October 14, 2012 || Kitt Peak || Spacewatch ||  || align=right | 1.7 km || 
|-id=600 bgcolor=#E9E9E9
| 576600 ||  || — || October 6, 2012 || Haleakala || Pan-STARRS ||  || align=right | 2.0 km || 
|}

576601–576700 

|-bgcolor=#d6d6d6
| 576601 ||  || — || December 4, 2007 || Kitt Peak || Spacewatch ||  || align=right | 2.3 km || 
|-id=602 bgcolor=#E9E9E9
| 576602 ||  || — || April 2, 2006 || Kitt Peak || Spacewatch || AGN || align=right | 1.2 km || 
|-id=603 bgcolor=#E9E9E9
| 576603 ||  || — || October 5, 2012 || Mount Lemmon || Mount Lemmon Survey ||  || align=right | 2.1 km || 
|-id=604 bgcolor=#fefefe
| 576604 ||  || — || October 1, 2005 || Kitt Peak || Spacewatch ||  || align=right data-sort-value="0.49" | 490 m || 
|-id=605 bgcolor=#E9E9E9
| 576605 ||  || — || October 11, 2012 || Kitt Peak || Spacewatch ||  || align=right | 1.9 km || 
|-id=606 bgcolor=#E9E9E9
| 576606 ||  || — || September 26, 2012 || Catalina || CSS ||  || align=right | 2.8 km || 
|-id=607 bgcolor=#E9E9E9
| 576607 ||  || — || December 5, 2008 || Kitt Peak || Spacewatch ||  || align=right | 2.3 km || 
|-id=608 bgcolor=#d6d6d6
| 576608 ||  || — || October 7, 2012 || Haleakala || Pan-STARRS ||  || align=right | 2.7 km || 
|-id=609 bgcolor=#E9E9E9
| 576609 ||  || — || October 7, 2012 || Haleakala || Pan-STARRS ||  || align=right | 1.9 km || 
|-id=610 bgcolor=#E9E9E9
| 576610 ||  || — || March 10, 2005 || Mount Lemmon || Mount Lemmon Survey || GEF || align=right | 1.1 km || 
|-id=611 bgcolor=#d6d6d6
| 576611 ||  || — || September 21, 2012 || Kitt Peak || Spacewatch ||  || align=right | 2.0 km || 
|-id=612 bgcolor=#E9E9E9
| 576612 ||  || — || October 11, 2012 || Haleakala || Pan-STARRS ||  || align=right | 1.9 km || 
|-id=613 bgcolor=#d6d6d6
| 576613 ||  || — || October 11, 2012 || Haleakala || Pan-STARRS ||  || align=right | 2.6 km || 
|-id=614 bgcolor=#d6d6d6
| 576614 ||  || — || October 11, 2012 || Piszkesteto || K. Sárneczky || EOS || align=right | 1.8 km || 
|-id=615 bgcolor=#E9E9E9
| 576615 ||  || — || June 25, 2011 || Nogales || M. Schwartz, P. R. Holvorcem ||  || align=right | 3.2 km || 
|-id=616 bgcolor=#E9E9E9
| 576616 ||  || — || October 5, 2012 || Haleakala || Pan-STARRS ||  || align=right | 1.8 km || 
|-id=617 bgcolor=#d6d6d6
| 576617 ||  || — || September 4, 2007 || Mount Lemmon || Mount Lemmon Survey ||  || align=right | 1.4 km || 
|-id=618 bgcolor=#d6d6d6
| 576618 ||  || — || September 13, 2007 || Mount Lemmon || Mount Lemmon Survey || KOR || align=right | 1.0 km || 
|-id=619 bgcolor=#E9E9E9
| 576619 ||  || — || October 8, 2012 || Haleakala || Pan-STARRS ||  || align=right | 1.6 km || 
|-id=620 bgcolor=#d6d6d6
| 576620 ||  || — || October 19, 2007 || Mount Lemmon || Mount Lemmon Survey ||  || align=right | 2.2 km || 
|-id=621 bgcolor=#d6d6d6
| 576621 ||  || — || October 8, 2012 || Haleakala || Pan-STARRS ||  || align=right | 2.0 km || 
|-id=622 bgcolor=#d6d6d6
| 576622 ||  || — || October 8, 2012 || Mount Lemmon || Mount Lemmon Survey || KOR || align=right | 1.1 km || 
|-id=623 bgcolor=#E9E9E9
| 576623 ||  || — || October 8, 2012 || Mount Lemmon || Mount Lemmon Survey ||  || align=right | 1.8 km || 
|-id=624 bgcolor=#fefefe
| 576624 ||  || — || October 8, 2012 || Haleakala || Pan-STARRS ||  || align=right data-sort-value="0.66" | 660 m || 
|-id=625 bgcolor=#d6d6d6
| 576625 ||  || — || October 8, 2012 || Haleakala || Pan-STARRS ||  || align=right | 2.2 km || 
|-id=626 bgcolor=#E9E9E9
| 576626 ||  || — || September 16, 2012 || Kitt Peak || Spacewatch ||  || align=right | 1.8 km || 
|-id=627 bgcolor=#E9E9E9
| 576627 ||  || — || November 8, 2008 || Kitt Peak || Spacewatch ||  || align=right | 1.9 km || 
|-id=628 bgcolor=#C2FFFF
| 576628 ||  || — || October 11, 2012 || Mount Lemmon || Mount Lemmon Survey || L5 || align=right | 7.3 km || 
|-id=629 bgcolor=#d6d6d6
| 576629 ||  || — || October 15, 2012 || Mount Lemmon || Mount Lemmon Survey ||  || align=right | 1.6 km || 
|-id=630 bgcolor=#d6d6d6
| 576630 ||  || — || October 6, 2012 || Mount Lemmon || Mount Lemmon Survey ||  || align=right | 2.5 km || 
|-id=631 bgcolor=#d6d6d6
| 576631 ||  || — || October 11, 2012 || Haleakala || Pan-STARRS ||  || align=right | 3.2 km || 
|-id=632 bgcolor=#C2FFFF
| 576632 ||  || — || October 11, 2012 || Haleakala || Pan-STARRS || L5 || align=right | 6.7 km || 
|-id=633 bgcolor=#E9E9E9
| 576633 ||  || — || February 9, 2005 || Mount Lemmon || Mount Lemmon Survey ||  || align=right | 1.4 km || 
|-id=634 bgcolor=#d6d6d6
| 576634 ||  || — || January 27, 2003 || Palomar || NEAT || HYG || align=right | 3.4 km || 
|-id=635 bgcolor=#d6d6d6
| 576635 ||  || — || October 17, 2001 || Socorro || LINEAR ||  || align=right | 3.5 km || 
|-id=636 bgcolor=#d6d6d6
| 576636 ||  || — || October 10, 2012 || Nogales || M. Schwartz, P. R. Holvorcem ||  || align=right | 3.3 km || 
|-id=637 bgcolor=#d6d6d6
| 576637 ||  || — || October 10, 2012 || Mount Lemmon || Mount Lemmon Survey ||  || align=right | 2.2 km || 
|-id=638 bgcolor=#d6d6d6
| 576638 ||  || — || October 8, 2012 || Haleakala || Pan-STARRS ||  || align=right | 2.0 km || 
|-id=639 bgcolor=#fefefe
| 576639 ||  || — || October 14, 1999 || Kitt Peak || Spacewatch ||  || align=right data-sort-value="0.50" | 500 m || 
|-id=640 bgcolor=#d6d6d6
| 576640 ||  || — || October 14, 2012 || Kitt Peak || Spacewatch ||  || align=right | 2.5 km || 
|-id=641 bgcolor=#d6d6d6
| 576641 ||  || — || October 14, 2012 || Kitt Peak || Spacewatch ||  || align=right | 2.1 km || 
|-id=642 bgcolor=#d6d6d6
| 576642 ||  || — || March 1, 2003 || Cerro Tololo || Cerro Tololo Obs. ||  || align=right | 2.9 km || 
|-id=643 bgcolor=#d6d6d6
| 576643 ||  || — || September 20, 2001 || Socorro || LINEAR ||  || align=right | 2.8 km || 
|-id=644 bgcolor=#d6d6d6
| 576644 ||  || — || October 7, 2012 || Haleakala || Pan-STARRS ||  || align=right | 3.7 km || 
|-id=645 bgcolor=#E9E9E9
| 576645 ||  || — || September 15, 2012 || ESA OGS || ESA OGS ||  || align=right | 1.8 km || 
|-id=646 bgcolor=#d6d6d6
| 576646 ||  || — || October 11, 2012 || Piszkesteto || K. Sárneczky ||  || align=right | 2.7 km || 
|-id=647 bgcolor=#fefefe
| 576647 ||  || — || September 27, 2002 || Palomar || NEAT ||  || align=right data-sort-value="0.88" | 880 m || 
|-id=648 bgcolor=#E9E9E9
| 576648 ||  || — || October 7, 2012 || Haleakala || Pan-STARRS || JUN || align=right | 1.1 km || 
|-id=649 bgcolor=#E9E9E9
| 576649 ||  || — || July 20, 2007 || Lulin || LUSS ||  || align=right | 2.5 km || 
|-id=650 bgcolor=#fefefe
| 576650 ||  || — || November 18, 2009 || Kitt Peak || Spacewatch ||  || align=right | 1.3 km || 
|-id=651 bgcolor=#E9E9E9
| 576651 ||  || — || October 1, 2003 || Kitt Peak || Spacewatch ||  || align=right | 1.7 km || 
|-id=652 bgcolor=#E9E9E9
| 576652 ||  || — || August 10, 2007 || Kitt Peak || Spacewatch ||  || align=right | 2.0 km || 
|-id=653 bgcolor=#d6d6d6
| 576653 ||  || — || October 9, 2012 || Haleakala || Pan-STARRS ||  || align=right | 2.1 km || 
|-id=654 bgcolor=#d6d6d6
| 576654 ||  || — || October 11, 2012 || Haleakala || Pan-STARRS ||  || align=right | 2.2 km || 
|-id=655 bgcolor=#d6d6d6
| 576655 ||  || — || October 14, 2012 || Kitt Peak || Spacewatch ||  || align=right | 2.9 km || 
|-id=656 bgcolor=#d6d6d6
| 576656 ||  || — || October 11, 2012 || Piszkesteto || K. Sárneczky ||  || align=right | 2.7 km || 
|-id=657 bgcolor=#d6d6d6
| 576657 ||  || — || October 10, 2012 || Haleakala || Pan-STARRS ||  || align=right | 2.4 km || 
|-id=658 bgcolor=#d6d6d6
| 576658 ||  || — || October 10, 2012 || Mount Lemmon || Mount Lemmon Survey ||  || align=right | 2.4 km || 
|-id=659 bgcolor=#d6d6d6
| 576659 ||  || — || December 11, 2013 || Haleakala || Pan-STARRS ||  || align=right | 2.7 km || 
|-id=660 bgcolor=#E9E9E9
| 576660 ||  || — || October 4, 2012 || Mount Lemmon || Mount Lemmon Survey ||  || align=right | 1.9 km || 
|-id=661 bgcolor=#d6d6d6
| 576661 ||  || — || October 11, 2012 || Piszkesteto || K. Sárneczky ||  || align=right | 2.0 km || 
|-id=662 bgcolor=#d6d6d6
| 576662 ||  || — || October 8, 2012 || Kitt Peak || Spacewatch ||  || align=right | 2.6 km || 
|-id=663 bgcolor=#E9E9E9
| 576663 ||  || — || October 6, 2012 || Haleakala || Pan-STARRS ||  || align=right | 2.1 km || 
|-id=664 bgcolor=#d6d6d6
| 576664 ||  || — || September 30, 2017 || Haleakala || Pan-STARRS ||  || align=right | 1.9 km || 
|-id=665 bgcolor=#d6d6d6
| 576665 ||  || — || January 2, 2014 || Kitt Peak || Spacewatch ||  || align=right | 3.1 km || 
|-id=666 bgcolor=#E9E9E9
| 576666 ||  || — || October 15, 2012 || Haleakala || Pan-STARRS ||  || align=right | 1.1 km || 
|-id=667 bgcolor=#d6d6d6
| 576667 ||  || — || January 21, 2015 || Haleakala || Pan-STARRS ||  || align=right | 2.4 km || 
|-id=668 bgcolor=#E9E9E9
| 576668 ||  || — || October 10, 2012 || Haleakala || Pan-STARRS ||  || align=right data-sort-value="0.95" | 950 m || 
|-id=669 bgcolor=#d6d6d6
| 576669 ||  || — || May 17, 2016 || Haleakala || Pan-STARRS ||  || align=right | 2.8 km || 
|-id=670 bgcolor=#fefefe
| 576670 ||  || — || October 8, 2012 || Mount Lemmon || Mount Lemmon Survey ||  || align=right data-sort-value="0.49" | 490 m || 
|-id=671 bgcolor=#d6d6d6
| 576671 ||  || — || October 14, 2012 || Kitt Peak || Spacewatch || 7:4 || align=right | 3.4 km || 
|-id=672 bgcolor=#d6d6d6
| 576672 ||  || — || September 30, 2017 || Mount Lemmon || Mount Lemmon Survey ||  || align=right | 2.7 km || 
|-id=673 bgcolor=#C2FFFF
| 576673 ||  || — || October 5, 2013 || Haleakala || Pan-STARRS || L5 || align=right | 7.7 km || 
|-id=674 bgcolor=#d6d6d6
| 576674 ||  || — || January 9, 2014 || Haleakala || Pan-STARRS ||  || align=right | 2.3 km || 
|-id=675 bgcolor=#d6d6d6
| 576675 ||  || — || October 8, 2012 || Haleakala || Pan-STARRS ||  || align=right | 2.3 km || 
|-id=676 bgcolor=#d6d6d6
| 576676 ||  || — || October 10, 2012 || Mount Lemmon || Mount Lemmon Survey ||  || align=right | 2.2 km || 
|-id=677 bgcolor=#d6d6d6
| 576677 ||  || — || January 4, 2014 || Mount Lemmon || Mount Lemmon Survey ||  || align=right | 2.7 km || 
|-id=678 bgcolor=#d6d6d6
| 576678 ||  || — || January 28, 2015 || Haleakala || Pan-STARRS ||  || align=right | 2.1 km || 
|-id=679 bgcolor=#C2FFFF
| 576679 ||  || — || October 3, 2013 || Mount Lemmon || Mount Lemmon Survey || L5 || align=right | 6.9 km || 
|-id=680 bgcolor=#d6d6d6
| 576680 ||  || — || October 8, 2012 || Mount Lemmon || Mount Lemmon Survey ||  || align=right | 1.9 km || 
|-id=681 bgcolor=#d6d6d6
| 576681 ||  || — || October 11, 2012 || Haleakala || Pan-STARRS ||  || align=right | 2.3 km || 
|-id=682 bgcolor=#E9E9E9
| 576682 ||  || — || October 8, 2012 || Haleakala || Pan-STARRS ||  || align=right | 1.4 km || 
|-id=683 bgcolor=#fefefe
| 576683 ||  || — || October 11, 2012 || Haleakala || Pan-STARRS ||  || align=right data-sort-value="0.44" | 440 m || 
|-id=684 bgcolor=#d6d6d6
| 576684 ||  || — || October 8, 2012 || Mount Lemmon || Mount Lemmon Survey ||  || align=right | 2.7 km || 
|-id=685 bgcolor=#d6d6d6
| 576685 ||  || — || October 10, 2012 || Mount Lemmon || Mount Lemmon Survey ||  || align=right | 1.7 km || 
|-id=686 bgcolor=#E9E9E9
| 576686 ||  || — || October 14, 2012 || Kitt Peak || Spacewatch ||  || align=right | 1.2 km || 
|-id=687 bgcolor=#C2FFFF
| 576687 ||  || — || October 9, 2012 || Mount Lemmon || Mount Lemmon Survey || L5 || align=right | 6.8 km || 
|-id=688 bgcolor=#d6d6d6
| 576688 ||  || — || October 13, 2012 || Catalina || CSS ||  || align=right | 2.8 km || 
|-id=689 bgcolor=#d6d6d6
| 576689 ||  || — || October 6, 2012 || Mount Lemmon || Mount Lemmon Survey ||  || align=right | 2.1 km || 
|-id=690 bgcolor=#d6d6d6
| 576690 ||  || — || October 9, 2012 || Haleakala || Pan-STARRS ||  || align=right | 1.6 km || 
|-id=691 bgcolor=#E9E9E9
| 576691 ||  || — || October 8, 2012 || Mount Lemmon || Mount Lemmon Survey ||  || align=right | 1.5 km || 
|-id=692 bgcolor=#E9E9E9
| 576692 ||  || — || October 8, 2012 || Mount Lemmon || Mount Lemmon Survey ||  || align=right | 1.2 km || 
|-id=693 bgcolor=#E9E9E9
| 576693 ||  || — || October 15, 2012 || Haleakala || Pan-STARRS ||  || align=right | 1.7 km || 
|-id=694 bgcolor=#d6d6d6
| 576694 ||  || — || October 7, 2012 || Haleakala || Pan-STARRS ||  || align=right | 2.1 km || 
|-id=695 bgcolor=#fefefe
| 576695 ||  || — || October 10, 2012 || Haleakala || Pan-STARRS ||  || align=right data-sort-value="0.75" | 750 m || 
|-id=696 bgcolor=#C2FFFF
| 576696 ||  || — || October 7, 2012 || Haleakala || Pan-STARRS || L5 || align=right | 9.7 km || 
|-id=697 bgcolor=#d6d6d6
| 576697 ||  || — || October 8, 2012 || Haleakala || Pan-STARRS || 7:4 || align=right | 4.2 km || 
|-id=698 bgcolor=#d6d6d6
| 576698 ||  || — || October 16, 2012 || Mount Lemmon || Mount Lemmon Survey ||  || align=right | 2.2 km || 
|-id=699 bgcolor=#d6d6d6
| 576699 ||  || — || August 8, 2005 || Cerro Tololo || Cerro Tololo Obs. ||  || align=right | 2.4 km || 
|-id=700 bgcolor=#E9E9E9
| 576700 ||  || — || October 24, 2008 || Kitt Peak || Spacewatch ||  || align=right | 1.2 km || 
|}

576701–576800 

|-bgcolor=#E9E9E9
| 576701 ||  || — || October 8, 2012 || Mount Lemmon || Mount Lemmon Survey ||  || align=right | 1.8 km || 
|-id=702 bgcolor=#d6d6d6
| 576702 ||  || — || September 13, 2007 || Mount Lemmon || Mount Lemmon Survey ||  || align=right | 2.2 km || 
|-id=703 bgcolor=#d6d6d6
| 576703 ||  || — || October 16, 2012 || Mount Lemmon || Mount Lemmon Survey ||  || align=right | 2.2 km || 
|-id=704 bgcolor=#d6d6d6
| 576704 ||  || — || October 8, 2012 || Mount Lemmon || Mount Lemmon Survey ||  || align=right | 2.2 km || 
|-id=705 bgcolor=#d6d6d6
| 576705 ||  || — || October 16, 2012 || Mount Lemmon || Mount Lemmon Survey ||  || align=right | 2.3 km || 
|-id=706 bgcolor=#d6d6d6
| 576706 ||  || — || October 8, 2007 || Mount Lemmon || Mount Lemmon Survey ||  || align=right | 1.8 km || 
|-id=707 bgcolor=#E9E9E9
| 576707 ||  || — || February 4, 2005 || Mount Lemmon || Mount Lemmon Survey ||  || align=right | 1.6 km || 
|-id=708 bgcolor=#d6d6d6
| 576708 ||  || — || May 2, 2006 || Mount Lemmon || Mount Lemmon Survey ||  || align=right | 1.6 km || 
|-id=709 bgcolor=#d6d6d6
| 576709 ||  || — || October 17, 2012 || Mount Lemmon || Mount Lemmon Survey ||  || align=right | 1.9 km || 
|-id=710 bgcolor=#d6d6d6
| 576710 ||  || — || October 17, 2012 || Mount Lemmon || Mount Lemmon Survey ||  || align=right | 2.8 km || 
|-id=711 bgcolor=#d6d6d6
| 576711 ||  || — || October 17, 2012 || Mount Lemmon || Mount Lemmon Survey ||  || align=right | 2.3 km || 
|-id=712 bgcolor=#fefefe
| 576712 ||  || — || October 6, 2012 || Mount Lemmon || Mount Lemmon Survey ||  || align=right data-sort-value="0.48" | 480 m || 
|-id=713 bgcolor=#d6d6d6
| 576713 ||  || — || December 29, 2008 || Mount Lemmon || Mount Lemmon Survey ||  || align=right | 2.5 km || 
|-id=714 bgcolor=#d6d6d6
| 576714 ||  || — || October 17, 2012 || Mount Lemmon || Mount Lemmon Survey ||  || align=right | 2.8 km || 
|-id=715 bgcolor=#d6d6d6
| 576715 ||  || — || October 17, 2012 || Mount Lemmon || Mount Lemmon Survey ||  || align=right | 3.2 km || 
|-id=716 bgcolor=#d6d6d6
| 576716 ||  || — || October 11, 2012 || Piszkesteto || K. Sárneczky || EOS || align=right | 2.3 km || 
|-id=717 bgcolor=#C2FFFF
| 576717 ||  || — || October 20, 2012 || Mount Lemmon || Mount Lemmon Survey || L4 || align=right | 11 km || 
|-id=718 bgcolor=#E9E9E9
| 576718 ||  || — || August 10, 2007 || Kitt Peak || Spacewatch ||  || align=right | 1.4 km || 
|-id=719 bgcolor=#d6d6d6
| 576719 ||  || — || October 18, 2012 || Haleakala || Pan-STARRS ||  || align=right | 1.7 km || 
|-id=720 bgcolor=#E9E9E9
| 576720 ||  || — || September 16, 2012 || Mount Lemmon || Mount Lemmon Survey ||  || align=right | 1.7 km || 
|-id=721 bgcolor=#E9E9E9
| 576721 ||  || — || October 8, 2012 || Kitt Peak || Spacewatch ||  || align=right | 2.2 km || 
|-id=722 bgcolor=#d6d6d6
| 576722 ||  || — || October 8, 2012 || Catalina || CSS ||  || align=right | 3.1 km || 
|-id=723 bgcolor=#d6d6d6
| 576723 ||  || — || October 19, 2012 || Haleakala || Pan-STARRS ||  || align=right | 2.1 km || 
|-id=724 bgcolor=#d6d6d6
| 576724 ||  || — || October 20, 2007 || Mount Lemmon || Mount Lemmon Survey ||  || align=right | 2.2 km || 
|-id=725 bgcolor=#d6d6d6
| 576725 ||  || — || October 1, 2011 || Piszkesteto || K. Sárneczky ||  || align=right | 3.1 km || 
|-id=726 bgcolor=#E9E9E9
| 576726 ||  || — || May 25, 2006 || Kitt Peak || Spacewatch ||  || align=right | 2.1 km || 
|-id=727 bgcolor=#fefefe
| 576727 ||  || — || April 29, 2011 || Mount Lemmon || Mount Lemmon Survey ||  || align=right data-sort-value="0.55" | 550 m || 
|-id=728 bgcolor=#d6d6d6
| 576728 ||  || — || October 20, 2012 || Haleakala || Pan-STARRS || Tj (2.98) || align=right | 2.8 km || 
|-id=729 bgcolor=#d6d6d6
| 576729 ||  || — || September 13, 2007 || Kitt Peak || Spacewatch ||  || align=right | 1.8 km || 
|-id=730 bgcolor=#d6d6d6
| 576730 ||  || — || September 15, 2007 || Mount Lemmon || Mount Lemmon Survey ||  || align=right | 2.2 km || 
|-id=731 bgcolor=#d6d6d6
| 576731 ||  || — || November 1, 2007 || Kitt Peak || Spacewatch ||  || align=right | 2.7 km || 
|-id=732 bgcolor=#E9E9E9
| 576732 ||  || — || October 20, 2012 || Kitt Peak || Spacewatch ||  || align=right data-sort-value="0.86" | 860 m || 
|-id=733 bgcolor=#E9E9E9
| 576733 ||  || — || October 9, 2012 || Mount Lemmon || Mount Lemmon Survey ||  || align=right | 1.8 km || 
|-id=734 bgcolor=#E9E9E9
| 576734 ||  || — || October 9, 2012 || Mount Lemmon || Mount Lemmon Survey ||  || align=right | 1.9 km || 
|-id=735 bgcolor=#d6d6d6
| 576735 ||  || — || October 18, 2001 || Palomar || NEAT ||  || align=right | 3.3 km || 
|-id=736 bgcolor=#d6d6d6
| 576736 ||  || — || September 12, 2007 || Kitt Peak || Spacewatch ||  || align=right | 2.0 km || 
|-id=737 bgcolor=#fefefe
| 576737 ||  || — || October 5, 2012 || Kitt Peak || Spacewatch || H || align=right data-sort-value="0.57" | 570 m || 
|-id=738 bgcolor=#d6d6d6
| 576738 ||  || — || January 16, 2004 || Palomar || NEAT ||  || align=right | 2.4 km || 
|-id=739 bgcolor=#d6d6d6
| 576739 ||  || — || October 8, 2002 || Kitt Peak || Spacewatch ||  || align=right | 2.0 km || 
|-id=740 bgcolor=#d6d6d6
| 576740 ||  || — || October 20, 2007 || Kitt Peak || Spacewatch ||  || align=right | 1.6 km || 
|-id=741 bgcolor=#d6d6d6
| 576741 ||  || — || October 18, 2012 || Haleakala || Pan-STARRS ||  || align=right | 1.9 km || 
|-id=742 bgcolor=#d6d6d6
| 576742 ||  || — || October 19, 2012 || Haleakala || Pan-STARRS ||  || align=right | 2.4 km || 
|-id=743 bgcolor=#d6d6d6
| 576743 ||  || — || November 7, 2007 || Kitt Peak || Spacewatch ||  || align=right | 2.8 km || 
|-id=744 bgcolor=#d6d6d6
| 576744 ||  || — || November 13, 2007 || Kitt Peak || Spacewatch ||  || align=right | 3.3 km || 
|-id=745 bgcolor=#d6d6d6
| 576745 ||  || — || October 19, 2012 || Haleakala || Pan-STARRS ||  || align=right | 1.9 km || 
|-id=746 bgcolor=#E9E9E9
| 576746 ||  || — || October 11, 2012 || Haleakala || Pan-STARRS ||  || align=right | 1.8 km || 
|-id=747 bgcolor=#d6d6d6
| 576747 ||  || — || September 28, 2006 || Kitt Peak || Spacewatch ||  || align=right | 2.1 km || 
|-id=748 bgcolor=#d6d6d6
| 576748 ||  || — || February 11, 2004 || Palomar || NEAT ||  || align=right | 2.9 km || 
|-id=749 bgcolor=#d6d6d6
| 576749 ||  || — || November 3, 2007 || Kitt Peak || Spacewatch ||  || align=right | 2.4 km || 
|-id=750 bgcolor=#fefefe
| 576750 ||  || — || November 11, 2009 || Kitt Peak || Spacewatch ||  || align=right data-sort-value="0.69" | 690 m || 
|-id=751 bgcolor=#E9E9E9
| 576751 ||  || — || October 15, 2012 || Kitt Peak || Spacewatch || GEF || align=right | 1.1 km || 
|-id=752 bgcolor=#d6d6d6
| 576752 ||  || — || October 22, 2012 || Haleakala || Pan-STARRS ||  || align=right | 1.9 km || 
|-id=753 bgcolor=#d6d6d6
| 576753 ||  || — || October 10, 2012 || Mount Lemmon || Mount Lemmon Survey ||  || align=right | 3.3 km || 
|-id=754 bgcolor=#d6d6d6
| 576754 ||  || — || October 18, 2012 || Mount Lemmon || Mount Lemmon Survey ||  || align=right | 2.9 km || 
|-id=755 bgcolor=#d6d6d6
| 576755 ||  || — || June 25, 2011 || Mount Lemmon || Mount Lemmon Survey ||  || align=right | 3.1 km || 
|-id=756 bgcolor=#d6d6d6
| 576756 ||  || — || October 19, 2012 || Mount Lemmon || Mount Lemmon Survey ||  || align=right | 2.5 km || 
|-id=757 bgcolor=#E9E9E9
| 576757 ||  || — || October 19, 2012 || Haleakala || Pan-STARRS ||  || align=right | 3.0 km || 
|-id=758 bgcolor=#E9E9E9
| 576758 ||  || — || November 19, 2003 || Kitt Peak || Spacewatch ||  || align=right | 2.9 km || 
|-id=759 bgcolor=#E9E9E9
| 576759 ||  || — || October 18, 2012 || Mount Lemmon || Mount Lemmon Survey ||  || align=right | 2.5 km || 
|-id=760 bgcolor=#E9E9E9
| 576760 ||  || — || December 22, 2008 || Mount Lemmon || Mount Lemmon Survey ||  || align=right | 2.3 km || 
|-id=761 bgcolor=#E9E9E9
| 576761 ||  || — || September 13, 2007 || Lulin || LUSS ||  || align=right | 2.4 km || 
|-id=762 bgcolor=#d6d6d6
| 576762 ||  || — || October 10, 2007 || Kitt Peak || Spacewatch ||  || align=right | 3.2 km || 
|-id=763 bgcolor=#FFC2E0
| 576763 ||  || — || October 20, 2012 || Haleakala || Pan-STARRS || AMOPHA || align=right data-sort-value="0.51" | 510 m || 
|-id=764 bgcolor=#fefefe
| 576764 ||  || — || October 22, 2012 || Haleakala || Pan-STARRS ||  || align=right data-sort-value="0.52" | 520 m || 
|-id=765 bgcolor=#C2FFFF
| 576765 ||  || — || October 21, 2012 || Mount Lemmon || Mount Lemmon Survey || L4 || align=right | 11 km || 
|-id=766 bgcolor=#d6d6d6
| 576766 ||  || — || November 13, 2007 || Kitt Peak || Spacewatch || EOS || align=right | 1.5 km || 
|-id=767 bgcolor=#d6d6d6
| 576767 ||  || — || October 19, 2012 || Mount Lemmon || Mount Lemmon Survey ||  || align=right | 2.3 km || 
|-id=768 bgcolor=#E9E9E9
| 576768 ||  || — || October 20, 2012 || Haleakala || Pan-STARRS ||  || align=right | 1.2 km || 
|-id=769 bgcolor=#E9E9E9
| 576769 ||  || — || October 21, 2012 || Kitt Peak || Spacewatch ||  || align=right | 2.2 km || 
|-id=770 bgcolor=#d6d6d6
| 576770 ||  || — || April 2, 2005 || Kitt Peak || Spacewatch ||  || align=right | 2.7 km || 
|-id=771 bgcolor=#E9E9E9
| 576771 ||  || — || October 21, 2012 || Kitt Peak || Spacewatch ||  || align=right | 1.4 km || 
|-id=772 bgcolor=#E9E9E9
| 576772 ||  || — || October 21, 2012 || Haleakala || Pan-STARRS ||  || align=right | 1.3 km || 
|-id=773 bgcolor=#E9E9E9
| 576773 ||  || — || August 5, 2002 || Palomar || NEAT ||  || align=right | 2.1 km || 
|-id=774 bgcolor=#d6d6d6
| 576774 ||  || — || November 18, 2001 || Apache Point || SDSS Collaboration || EOS || align=right | 1.9 km || 
|-id=775 bgcolor=#d6d6d6
| 576775 ||  || — || December 22, 2008 || Kitt Peak || Spacewatch ||  || align=right | 2.3 km || 
|-id=776 bgcolor=#fefefe
| 576776 ||  || — || October 23, 2012 || Haleakala || Pan-STARRS ||  || align=right data-sort-value="0.53" | 530 m || 
|-id=777 bgcolor=#d6d6d6
| 576777 ||  || — || February 18, 2004 || Kitt Peak || Spacewatch || EOS || align=right | 2.3 km || 
|-id=778 bgcolor=#d6d6d6
| 576778 ||  || — || December 18, 2001 || Kitt Peak || Spacewatch ||  || align=right | 2.8 km || 
|-id=779 bgcolor=#d6d6d6
| 576779 ||  || — || October 22, 2012 || Kitt Peak || Spacewatch ||  || align=right | 2.5 km || 
|-id=780 bgcolor=#d6d6d6
| 576780 ||  || — || January 25, 2003 || Palomar || NEAT ||  || align=right | 2.8 km || 
|-id=781 bgcolor=#d6d6d6
| 576781 ||  || — || February 18, 2004 || Kitt Peak || Spacewatch ||  || align=right | 2.4 km || 
|-id=782 bgcolor=#E9E9E9
| 576782 ||  || — || November 18, 2003 || Kitt Peak || Spacewatch ||  || align=right | 2.0 km || 
|-id=783 bgcolor=#fefefe
| 576783 ||  || — || January 10, 2006 || Mount Lemmon || Mount Lemmon Survey ||  || align=right data-sort-value="0.82" | 820 m || 
|-id=784 bgcolor=#d6d6d6
| 576784 ||  || — || August 24, 2006 || Palomar || NEAT ||  || align=right | 2.8 km || 
|-id=785 bgcolor=#E9E9E9
| 576785 ||  || — || May 22, 2011 || Mount Lemmon || Mount Lemmon Survey ||  || align=right | 2.7 km || 
|-id=786 bgcolor=#d6d6d6
| 576786 ||  || — || October 10, 2007 || Mount Lemmon || Mount Lemmon Survey ||  || align=right | 1.8 km || 
|-id=787 bgcolor=#d6d6d6
| 576787 ||  || — || November 5, 2007 || Mount Lemmon || Mount Lemmon Survey ||  || align=right | 2.1 km || 
|-id=788 bgcolor=#d6d6d6
| 576788 ||  || — || October 18, 2012 || Haleakala || Pan-STARRS ||  || align=right | 2.2 km || 
|-id=789 bgcolor=#E9E9E9
| 576789 ||  || — || November 19, 2003 || Kitt Peak || Spacewatch ||  || align=right | 2.0 km || 
|-id=790 bgcolor=#E9E9E9
| 576790 ||  || — || October 20, 2012 || Kitt Peak || Spacewatch ||  || align=right | 1.8 km || 
|-id=791 bgcolor=#d6d6d6
| 576791 ||  || — || August 2, 2011 || Haleakala || Pan-STARRS ||  || align=right | 1.9 km || 
|-id=792 bgcolor=#d6d6d6
| 576792 ||  || — || October 17, 2012 || Haleakala || Pan-STARRS ||  || align=right | 2.2 km || 
|-id=793 bgcolor=#d6d6d6
| 576793 ||  || — || October 20, 2012 || Piszkesteto || A. Király ||  || align=right | 2.1 km || 
|-id=794 bgcolor=#d6d6d6
| 576794 ||  || — || October 23, 2012 || Haleakala || Pan-STARRS ||  || align=right | 2.0 km || 
|-id=795 bgcolor=#d6d6d6
| 576795 ||  || — || October 22, 2012 || Haleakala || Pan-STARRS ||  || align=right | 2.8 km || 
|-id=796 bgcolor=#d6d6d6
| 576796 ||  || — || October 21, 2012 || Mount Lemmon || Mount Lemmon Survey ||  || align=right | 1.9 km || 
|-id=797 bgcolor=#d6d6d6
| 576797 ||  || — || October 20, 2012 || Kitt Peak || Spacewatch ||  || align=right | 2.0 km || 
|-id=798 bgcolor=#d6d6d6
| 576798 ||  || — || October 18, 2012 || Mount Lemmon || Mount Lemmon Survey ||  || align=right | 2.2 km || 
|-id=799 bgcolor=#d6d6d6
| 576799 ||  || — || October 17, 2012 || Mount Lemmon || Mount Lemmon Survey ||  || align=right | 2.2 km || 
|-id=800 bgcolor=#E9E9E9
| 576800 ||  || — || October 18, 2012 || Mount Lemmon || Mount Lemmon Survey ||  || align=right | 1.9 km || 
|}

576801–576900 

|-bgcolor=#d6d6d6
| 576801 ||  || — || October 22, 2012 || Haleakala || Pan-STARRS ||  || align=right | 2.2 km || 
|-id=802 bgcolor=#d6d6d6
| 576802 ||  || — || October 22, 2012 || Haleakala || Pan-STARRS ||  || align=right | 2.9 km || 
|-id=803 bgcolor=#d6d6d6
| 576803 ||  || — || September 27, 2017 || Haleakala || Pan-STARRS ||  || align=right | 2.1 km || 
|-id=804 bgcolor=#fefefe
| 576804 ||  || — || October 21, 2012 || Haleakala || Pan-STARRS ||  || align=right data-sort-value="0.58" | 580 m || 
|-id=805 bgcolor=#E9E9E9
| 576805 ||  || — || June 7, 2015 || Haleakala || Pan-STARRS ||  || align=right data-sort-value="0.86" | 860 m || 
|-id=806 bgcolor=#FA8072
| 576806 ||  || — || October 18, 2012 || Haleakala || Pan-STARRS ||  || align=right data-sort-value="0.57" | 570 m || 
|-id=807 bgcolor=#d6d6d6
| 576807 ||  || — || October 18, 2012 || Haleakala || Pan-STARRS ||  || align=right | 1.8 km || 
|-id=808 bgcolor=#fefefe
| 576808 ||  || — || October 18, 2012 || Haleakala || Pan-STARRS ||  || align=right data-sort-value="0.62" | 620 m || 
|-id=809 bgcolor=#fefefe
| 576809 ||  || — || October 17, 2012 || Mount Lemmon || Mount Lemmon Survey ||  || align=right data-sort-value="0.64" | 640 m || 
|-id=810 bgcolor=#d6d6d6
| 576810 ||  || — || October 20, 2012 || Mount Lemmon || Mount Lemmon Survey ||  || align=right | 2.2 km || 
|-id=811 bgcolor=#d6d6d6
| 576811 ||  || — || October 22, 2012 || Haleakala || Pan-STARRS ||  || align=right | 2.3 km || 
|-id=812 bgcolor=#E9E9E9
| 576812 ||  || — || October 18, 2012 || Haleakala || Pan-STARRS ||  || align=right | 1.1 km || 
|-id=813 bgcolor=#d6d6d6
| 576813 ||  || — || October 22, 2012 || Haleakala || Pan-STARRS ||  || align=right | 2.1 km || 
|-id=814 bgcolor=#d6d6d6
| 576814 ||  || — || October 8, 2012 || Mount Lemmon || Mount Lemmon Survey ||  || align=right | 1.7 km || 
|-id=815 bgcolor=#d6d6d6
| 576815 ||  || — || October 16, 2012 || Mount Lemmon || Mount Lemmon Survey ||  || align=right | 1.9 km || 
|-id=816 bgcolor=#d6d6d6
| 576816 ||  || — || October 17, 2012 || Haleakala || Pan-STARRS ||  || align=right | 1.6 km || 
|-id=817 bgcolor=#d6d6d6
| 576817 ||  || — || October 18, 2012 || Haleakala || Pan-STARRS ||  || align=right | 2.7 km || 
|-id=818 bgcolor=#d6d6d6
| 576818 ||  || — || October 22, 2012 || Mount Lemmon || Mount Lemmon Survey ||  || align=right | 2.6 km || 
|-id=819 bgcolor=#d6d6d6
| 576819 ||  || — || October 24, 2012 || Haleakala || Pan-STARRS ||  || align=right | 2.7 km || 
|-id=820 bgcolor=#d6d6d6
| 576820 ||  || — || October 19, 2012 || Mount Lemmon || Mount Lemmon Survey ||  || align=right | 3.7 km || 
|-id=821 bgcolor=#d6d6d6
| 576821 ||  || — || October 26, 2012 || Mount Lemmon || Mount Lemmon Survey ||  || align=right | 2.2 km || 
|-id=822 bgcolor=#fefefe
| 576822 ||  || — || May 25, 2011 || Mount Lemmon || Mount Lemmon Survey ||  || align=right data-sort-value="0.72" | 720 m || 
|-id=823 bgcolor=#E9E9E9
| 576823 ||  || — || March 18, 2010 || Mount Lemmon || Mount Lemmon Survey ||  || align=right | 1.2 km || 
|-id=824 bgcolor=#d6d6d6
| 576824 ||  || — || September 11, 2007 || Mount Lemmon || Mount Lemmon Survey ||  || align=right | 2.0 km || 
|-id=825 bgcolor=#d6d6d6
| 576825 ||  || — || October 11, 2007 || Mount Lemmon || Mount Lemmon Survey ||  || align=right | 2.7 km || 
|-id=826 bgcolor=#d6d6d6
| 576826 ||  || — || October 18, 2012 || Haleakala || Pan-STARRS ||  || align=right | 1.9 km || 
|-id=827 bgcolor=#fefefe
| 576827 ||  || — || October 6, 2012 || Mount Lemmon || Mount Lemmon Survey ||  || align=right data-sort-value="0.45" | 450 m || 
|-id=828 bgcolor=#d6d6d6
| 576828 ||  || — || June 27, 2011 || Kitt Peak || Spacewatch ||  || align=right | 2.7 km || 
|-id=829 bgcolor=#d6d6d6
| 576829 ||  || — || August 20, 2000 || Kitt Peak || Spacewatch ||  || align=right | 3.4 km || 
|-id=830 bgcolor=#fefefe
| 576830 ||  || — || October 16, 2012 || Catalina || CSS ||  || align=right data-sort-value="0.53" | 530 m || 
|-id=831 bgcolor=#E9E9E9
| 576831 ||  || — || April 26, 2006 || Cerro Tololo || Cerro Tololo Obs. ||  || align=right | 2.5 km || 
|-id=832 bgcolor=#E9E9E9
| 576832 ||  || — || October 20, 2012 || Kitt Peak || Spacewatch ||  || align=right | 1.5 km || 
|-id=833 bgcolor=#d6d6d6
| 576833 ||  || — || October 14, 2007 || Mount Lemmon || Mount Lemmon Survey || EOS || align=right | 1.3 km || 
|-id=834 bgcolor=#E9E9E9
| 576834 ||  || — || November 6, 2012 || Mount Lemmon || Mount Lemmon Survey ||  || align=right | 1.7 km || 
|-id=835 bgcolor=#E9E9E9
| 576835 ||  || — || October 23, 2012 || Mount Lemmon || Mount Lemmon Survey ||  || align=right | 1.2 km || 
|-id=836 bgcolor=#E9E9E9
| 576836 ||  || — || May 25, 2006 || Mauna Kea || Mauna Kea Obs. ||  || align=right | 1.6 km || 
|-id=837 bgcolor=#E9E9E9
| 576837 ||  || — || May 6, 2006 || Siding Spring || SSS ||  || align=right | 3.4 km || 
|-id=838 bgcolor=#d6d6d6
| 576838 ||  || — || May 2, 2005 || Reedy Creek || J. Broughton ||  || align=right | 3.1 km || 
|-id=839 bgcolor=#d6d6d6
| 576839 ||  || — || November 3, 2012 || Mount Lemmon || Mount Lemmon Survey ||  || align=right | 2.0 km || 
|-id=840 bgcolor=#E9E9E9
| 576840 ||  || — || March 10, 2005 || Mount Lemmon || Mount Lemmon Survey ||  || align=right | 1.9 km || 
|-id=841 bgcolor=#d6d6d6
| 576841 ||  || — || October 21, 2012 || Haleakala || Pan-STARRS ||  || align=right | 2.2 km || 
|-id=842 bgcolor=#fefefe
| 576842 ||  || — || October 21, 2012 || Mount Lemmon || Mount Lemmon Survey ||  || align=right data-sort-value="0.59" | 590 m || 
|-id=843 bgcolor=#fefefe
| 576843 ||  || — || September 23, 2008 || Mount Lemmon || Mount Lemmon Survey ||  || align=right data-sort-value="0.98" | 980 m || 
|-id=844 bgcolor=#d6d6d6
| 576844 ||  || — || April 7, 2005 || Mount Lemmon || Mount Lemmon Survey ||  || align=right | 2.1 km || 
|-id=845 bgcolor=#d6d6d6
| 576845 ||  || — || November 6, 2012 || Mount Lemmon || Mount Lemmon Survey ||  || align=right | 2.4 km || 
|-id=846 bgcolor=#d6d6d6
| 576846 ||  || — || October 20, 2012 || Kitt Peak || Spacewatch ||  || align=right | 2.3 km || 
|-id=847 bgcolor=#fefefe
| 576847 ||  || — || November 7, 2012 || Mount Lemmon || Mount Lemmon Survey || H || align=right data-sort-value="0.57" | 570 m || 
|-id=848 bgcolor=#fefefe
| 576848 ||  || — || November 6, 2012 || Kitt Peak || Spacewatch ||  || align=right data-sort-value="0.50" | 500 m || 
|-id=849 bgcolor=#d6d6d6
| 576849 ||  || — || October 30, 2007 || Kitt Peak || Spacewatch ||  || align=right | 1.8 km || 
|-id=850 bgcolor=#d6d6d6
| 576850 ||  || — || February 17, 2004 || Kitt Peak || Spacewatch ||  || align=right | 1.6 km || 
|-id=851 bgcolor=#d6d6d6
| 576851 ||  || — || October 21, 2006 || Palomar || NEAT ||  || align=right | 3.7 km || 
|-id=852 bgcolor=#fefefe
| 576852 ||  || — || October 6, 1996 || Kitt Peak || Spacewatch ||  || align=right data-sort-value="0.49" | 490 m || 
|-id=853 bgcolor=#E9E9E9
| 576853 Rafalreszelewski ||  ||  || October 16, 2012 || Tincana || M. Żołnowski, M. Kusiak ||  || align=right | 2.6 km || 
|-id=854 bgcolor=#fefefe
| 576854 ||  || — || October 18, 2012 || Haleakala || Pan-STARRS ||  || align=right data-sort-value="0.71" | 710 m || 
|-id=855 bgcolor=#d6d6d6
| 576855 ||  || — || February 22, 2009 || Kitt Peak || Spacewatch ||  || align=right | 2.5 km || 
|-id=856 bgcolor=#E9E9E9
| 576856 ||  || — || October 21, 2012 || Haleakala || Pan-STARRS ||  || align=right | 1.9 km || 
|-id=857 bgcolor=#E9E9E9
| 576857 ||  || — || September 18, 2003 || Palomar || NEAT ||  || align=right | 1.5 km || 
|-id=858 bgcolor=#d6d6d6
| 576858 ||  || — || October 25, 2012 || Kitt Peak || Spacewatch ||  || align=right | 2.0 km || 
|-id=859 bgcolor=#E9E9E9
| 576859 ||  || — || May 6, 2006 || Mount Lemmon || Mount Lemmon Survey ||  || align=right | 1.8 km || 
|-id=860 bgcolor=#fefefe
| 576860 ||  || — || October 20, 2012 || Mount Lemmon || Mount Lemmon Survey ||  || align=right data-sort-value="0.66" | 660 m || 
|-id=861 bgcolor=#d6d6d6
| 576861 ||  || — || April 9, 2010 || Mount Lemmon || Mount Lemmon Survey ||  || align=right | 2.6 km || 
|-id=862 bgcolor=#E9E9E9
| 576862 ||  || — || July 22, 2007 || Lulin || LUSS ||  || align=right | 2.0 km || 
|-id=863 bgcolor=#E9E9E9
| 576863 ||  || — || October 21, 2012 || Haleakala || Pan-STARRS ||  || align=right | 2.0 km || 
|-id=864 bgcolor=#fefefe
| 576864 ||  || — || December 21, 2006 || Kitt Peak || L. H. Wasserman ||  || align=right data-sort-value="0.67" | 670 m || 
|-id=865 bgcolor=#d6d6d6
| 576865 ||  || — || November 14, 2012 || Ka-Dar || V. Gerke ||  || align=right | 2.4 km || 
|-id=866 bgcolor=#d6d6d6
| 576866 ||  || — || October 15, 2012 || Kitt Peak || Spacewatch ||  || align=right | 3.3 km || 
|-id=867 bgcolor=#fefefe
| 576867 ||  || — || November 14, 2012 || Kitt Peak || Spacewatch ||  || align=right data-sort-value="0.98" | 980 m || 
|-id=868 bgcolor=#d6d6d6
| 576868 ||  || — || October 15, 2007 || Mount Lemmon || Mount Lemmon Survey ||  || align=right | 1.9 km || 
|-id=869 bgcolor=#d6d6d6
| 576869 ||  || — || September 19, 2006 || Catalina || CSS || EOS || align=right | 2.4 km || 
|-id=870 bgcolor=#d6d6d6
| 576870 ||  || — || October 18, 2012 || Piszkesteto || G. Hodosán ||  || align=right | 4.0 km || 
|-id=871 bgcolor=#E9E9E9
| 576871 ||  || — || March 19, 2010 || Mount Lemmon || Mount Lemmon Survey ||  || align=right | 2.9 km || 
|-id=872 bgcolor=#E9E9E9
| 576872 ||  || — || November 12, 2012 || Mount Lemmon || Mount Lemmon Survey ||  || align=right | 1.2 km || 
|-id=873 bgcolor=#fefefe
| 576873 ||  || — || November 13, 2012 || Mount Lemmon || Mount Lemmon Survey ||  || align=right data-sort-value="0.53" | 530 m || 
|-id=874 bgcolor=#E9E9E9
| 576874 ||  || — || October 8, 2012 || Mount Lemmon || Mount Lemmon Survey ||  || align=right | 2.0 km || 
|-id=875 bgcolor=#E9E9E9
| 576875 ||  || — || September 29, 2003 || Kitt Peak || Spacewatch ||  || align=right | 1.2 km || 
|-id=876 bgcolor=#d6d6d6
| 576876 ||  || — || March 27, 2009 || Mount Lemmon || Mount Lemmon Survey ||  || align=right | 3.6 km || 
|-id=877 bgcolor=#E9E9E9
| 576877 ||  || — || November 27, 2013 || Haleakala || Pan-STARRS ||  || align=right | 1.4 km || 
|-id=878 bgcolor=#d6d6d6
| 576878 ||  || — || February 24, 2014 || Haleakala || Pan-STARRS ||  || align=right | 2.3 km || 
|-id=879 bgcolor=#d6d6d6
| 576879 ||  || — || November 12, 2012 || Mount Lemmon || Mount Lemmon Survey ||  || align=right | 1.8 km || 
|-id=880 bgcolor=#E9E9E9
| 576880 ||  || — || November 4, 2012 || Mount Lemmon || Mount Lemmon Survey ||  || align=right | 1.9 km || 
|-id=881 bgcolor=#d6d6d6
| 576881 ||  || — || November 14, 2012 || Kitt Peak || Spacewatch ||  || align=right | 2.2 km || 
|-id=882 bgcolor=#E9E9E9
| 576882 ||  || — || September 30, 2017 || Mount Lemmon || Mount Lemmon Survey ||  || align=right | 2.0 km || 
|-id=883 bgcolor=#d6d6d6
| 576883 ||  || — || November 4, 2012 || Kitt Peak || Spacewatch ||  || align=right | 2.7 km || 
|-id=884 bgcolor=#d6d6d6
| 576884 ||  || — || November 7, 2012 || Haleakala || Pan-STARRS ||  || align=right | 2.1 km || 
|-id=885 bgcolor=#d6d6d6
| 576885 ||  || — || November 7, 2012 || Mount Lemmon || Mount Lemmon Survey ||  || align=right | 2.3 km || 
|-id=886 bgcolor=#d6d6d6
| 576886 ||  || — || November 16, 2012 || Charleston || R. Holmes || EOS || align=right | 1.7 km || 
|-id=887 bgcolor=#d6d6d6
| 576887 ||  || — || October 21, 2006 || Mount Lemmon || Mount Lemmon Survey ||  || align=right | 2.5 km || 
|-id=888 bgcolor=#d6d6d6
| 576888 ||  || — || November 13, 2007 || Kitt Peak || Spacewatch ||  || align=right | 2.0 km || 
|-id=889 bgcolor=#fefefe
| 576889 ||  || — || April 21, 2004 || Campo Imperatore || CINEOS ||  || align=right data-sort-value="0.60" | 600 m || 
|-id=890 bgcolor=#d6d6d6
| 576890 ||  || — || March 23, 2004 || Kitt Peak || Spacewatch ||  || align=right | 2.2 km || 
|-id=891 bgcolor=#d6d6d6
| 576891 ||  || — || October 17, 2001 || Palomar || NEAT ||  || align=right | 2.6 km || 
|-id=892 bgcolor=#d6d6d6
| 576892 ||  || — || October 22, 2012 || Mount Lemmon || Mount Lemmon Survey ||  || align=right | 2.9 km || 
|-id=893 bgcolor=#d6d6d6
| 576893 ||  || — || December 5, 2007 || Kitt Peak || Spacewatch ||  || align=right | 2.2 km || 
|-id=894 bgcolor=#d6d6d6
| 576894 ||  || — || October 20, 2006 || Mount Lemmon || Mount Lemmon Survey ||  || align=right | 2.9 km || 
|-id=895 bgcolor=#d6d6d6
| 576895 ||  || — || October 16, 2007 || Mount Lemmon || Mount Lemmon Survey ||  || align=right | 2.4 km || 
|-id=896 bgcolor=#d6d6d6
| 576896 ||  || — || September 27, 2006 || Kitt Peak || Spacewatch ||  || align=right | 2.7 km || 
|-id=897 bgcolor=#d6d6d6
| 576897 ||  || — || January 31, 2009 || Mount Lemmon || Mount Lemmon Survey ||  || align=right | 2.8 km || 
|-id=898 bgcolor=#d6d6d6
| 576898 ||  || — || October 27, 2012 || Mount Lemmon || Mount Lemmon Survey ||  || align=right | 3.9 km || 
|-id=899 bgcolor=#d6d6d6
| 576899 ||  || — || December 20, 2001 || Palomar || NEAT || TIR || align=right | 2.9 km || 
|-id=900 bgcolor=#fefefe
| 576900 ||  || — || August 31, 2005 || Kitt Peak || Spacewatch ||  || align=right data-sort-value="0.53" | 530 m || 
|}

576901–577000 

|-bgcolor=#d6d6d6
| 576901 Adagio ||  ||  || January 28, 2008 || Belesta || P. Martinez ||  || align=right | 3.4 km || 
|-id=902 bgcolor=#d6d6d6
| 576902 ||  || — || November 23, 2012 || Kitt Peak || Spacewatch ||  || align=right | 2.5 km || 
|-id=903 bgcolor=#d6d6d6
| 576903 ||  || — || November 22, 2012 || Kitt Peak || Spacewatch ||  || align=right | 2.9 km || 
|-id=904 bgcolor=#d6d6d6
| 576904 ||  || — || November 16, 2012 || Haleakala || Pan-STARRS ||  || align=right | 2.0 km || 
|-id=905 bgcolor=#fefefe
| 576905 ||  || — || October 29, 2005 || Mount Lemmon || Mount Lemmon Survey ||  || align=right data-sort-value="0.39" | 390 m || 
|-id=906 bgcolor=#d6d6d6
| 576906 ||  || — || October 22, 2012 || Kitt Peak || Spacewatch ||  || align=right | 2.7 km || 
|-id=907 bgcolor=#fefefe
| 576907 ||  || — || November 7, 2012 || Mount Lemmon || Mount Lemmon Survey ||  || align=right data-sort-value="0.60" | 600 m || 
|-id=908 bgcolor=#FA8072
| 576908 ||  || — || December 5, 2012 || Mount Lemmon || Mount Lemmon Survey ||  || align=right data-sort-value="0.62" | 620 m || 
|-id=909 bgcolor=#d6d6d6
| 576909 ||  || — || November 7, 2012 || Mount Lemmon || Mount Lemmon Survey ||  || align=right | 2.0 km || 
|-id=910 bgcolor=#E9E9E9
| 576910 ||  || — || November 17, 2012 || Mount Lemmon || Mount Lemmon Survey ||  || align=right | 1.7 km || 
|-id=911 bgcolor=#E9E9E9
| 576911 ||  || — || December 4, 2012 || Mount Lemmon || Mount Lemmon Survey ||  || align=right | 1.3 km || 
|-id=912 bgcolor=#d6d6d6
| 576912 ||  || — || December 5, 2012 || Mount Lemmon || Mount Lemmon Survey ||  || align=right | 2.5 km || 
|-id=913 bgcolor=#d6d6d6
| 576913 ||  || — || December 2, 2012 || Mount Lemmon || Mount Lemmon Survey ||  || align=right | 2.0 km || 
|-id=914 bgcolor=#d6d6d6
| 576914 ||  || — || December 2, 2012 || Mount Lemmon || Mount Lemmon Survey ||  || align=right | 3.0 km || 
|-id=915 bgcolor=#d6d6d6
| 576915 ||  || — || January 23, 2003 || La Silla || A. Boattini, O. R. Hainaut ||  || align=right | 2.8 km || 
|-id=916 bgcolor=#d6d6d6
| 576916 ||  || — || November 3, 2007 || Kitt Peak || Spacewatch ||  || align=right | 1.7 km || 
|-id=917 bgcolor=#d6d6d6
| 576917 ||  || — || November 17, 2012 || Kitt Peak || Spacewatch ||  || align=right | 3.1 km || 
|-id=918 bgcolor=#d6d6d6
| 576918 ||  || — || November 5, 2007 || Kitt Peak || Spacewatch ||  || align=right | 1.9 km || 
|-id=919 bgcolor=#d6d6d6
| 576919 ||  || — || November 7, 2012 || Mount Lemmon || Mount Lemmon Survey ||  || align=right | 2.4 km || 
|-id=920 bgcolor=#d6d6d6
| 576920 ||  || — || November 23, 2012 || Kitt Peak || Spacewatch ||  || align=right | 2.3 km || 
|-id=921 bgcolor=#d6d6d6
| 576921 ||  || — || August 12, 2001 || Haleakala || AMOS ||  || align=right | 2.4 km || 
|-id=922 bgcolor=#d6d6d6
| 576922 ||  || — || August 2, 2011 || Haleakala || Pan-STARRS ||  || align=right | 2.2 km || 
|-id=923 bgcolor=#d6d6d6
| 576923 ||  || — || December 3, 2012 || Mount Lemmon || Mount Lemmon Survey ||  || align=right | 3.0 km || 
|-id=924 bgcolor=#d6d6d6
| 576924 ||  || — || October 2, 2006 || Mount Lemmon || Mount Lemmon Survey ||  || align=right | 2.1 km || 
|-id=925 bgcolor=#E9E9E9
| 576925 ||  || — || December 3, 2012 || Mount Lemmon || Mount Lemmon Survey ||  || align=right | 1.0 km || 
|-id=926 bgcolor=#d6d6d6
| 576926 ||  || — || December 3, 2012 || Mount Lemmon || Mount Lemmon Survey ||  || align=right | 2.8 km || 
|-id=927 bgcolor=#fefefe
| 576927 ||  || — || December 3, 2012 || Mount Lemmon || Mount Lemmon Survey ||  || align=right data-sort-value="0.75" | 750 m || 
|-id=928 bgcolor=#d6d6d6
| 576928 ||  || — || November 7, 2012 || Haleakala || Pan-STARRS ||  || align=right | 1.9 km || 
|-id=929 bgcolor=#fefefe
| 576929 ||  || — || October 25, 2012 || Kitt Peak || Spacewatch ||  || align=right data-sort-value="0.74" | 740 m || 
|-id=930 bgcolor=#d6d6d6
| 576930 ||  || — || December 13, 2006 || Mount Lemmon || Mount Lemmon Survey || 7:4 || align=right | 3.7 km || 
|-id=931 bgcolor=#d6d6d6
| 576931 ||  || — || July 31, 2005 || Palomar || NEAT ||  || align=right | 4.1 km || 
|-id=932 bgcolor=#d6d6d6
| 576932 ||  || — || April 2, 2009 || Mount Lemmon || Mount Lemmon Survey ||  || align=right | 2.5 km || 
|-id=933 bgcolor=#d6d6d6
| 576933 ||  || — || November 14, 2007 || Kitt Peak || Spacewatch ||  || align=right | 2.0 km || 
|-id=934 bgcolor=#fefefe
| 576934 ||  || — || July 29, 2002 || Palomar || NEAT ||  || align=right data-sort-value="0.58" | 580 m || 
|-id=935 bgcolor=#d6d6d6
| 576935 ||  || — || December 4, 2012 || Mount Lemmon || Mount Lemmon Survey ||  || align=right | 2.3 km || 
|-id=936 bgcolor=#d6d6d6
| 576936 ||  || — || December 4, 2012 || Mount Lemmon || Mount Lemmon Survey ||  || align=right | 2.0 km || 
|-id=937 bgcolor=#d6d6d6
| 576937 ||  || — || December 4, 2012 || Mount Lemmon || Mount Lemmon Survey ||  || align=right | 2.2 km || 
|-id=938 bgcolor=#d6d6d6
| 576938 ||  || — || December 20, 2007 || Kitt Peak || Spacewatch ||  || align=right | 2.7 km || 
|-id=939 bgcolor=#d6d6d6
| 576939 ||  || — || December 31, 2007 || Mount Lemmon || Mount Lemmon Survey ||  || align=right | 2.3 km || 
|-id=940 bgcolor=#d6d6d6
| 576940 ||  || — || June 26, 2011 || Mount Lemmon || Mount Lemmon Survey ||  || align=right | 2.5 km || 
|-id=941 bgcolor=#d6d6d6
| 576941 ||  || — || December 5, 2012 || Nogales || M. Schwartz, P. R. Holvorcem ||  || align=right | 2.6 km || 
|-id=942 bgcolor=#d6d6d6
| 576942 ||  || — || September 21, 2011 || Mount Lemmon || Mount Lemmon Survey || VER || align=right | 2.2 km || 
|-id=943 bgcolor=#d6d6d6
| 576943 ||  || — || December 5, 2012 || Mount Lemmon || Mount Lemmon Survey ||  || align=right | 2.2 km || 
|-id=944 bgcolor=#d6d6d6
| 576944 ||  || — || September 19, 2006 || Kitt Peak || Spacewatch ||  || align=right | 2.8 km || 
|-id=945 bgcolor=#E9E9E9
| 576945 ||  || — || November 7, 2012 || Mount Lemmon || Mount Lemmon Survey ||  || align=right data-sort-value="0.82" | 820 m || 
|-id=946 bgcolor=#d6d6d6
| 576946 ||  || — || December 6, 2012 || Mount Lemmon || Mount Lemmon Survey ||  || align=right | 1.8 km || 
|-id=947 bgcolor=#E9E9E9
| 576947 ||  || — || November 23, 2012 || Kitt Peak || Spacewatch ||  || align=right | 1.1 km || 
|-id=948 bgcolor=#E9E9E9
| 576948 ||  || — || November 20, 2008 || Kitt Peak || Spacewatch ||  || align=right | 1.4 km || 
|-id=949 bgcolor=#E9E9E9
| 576949 ||  || — || November 23, 2012 || Kitt Peak || Spacewatch ||  || align=right | 1.7 km || 
|-id=950 bgcolor=#d6d6d6
| 576950 ||  || — || December 6, 2012 || Mount Lemmon || Mount Lemmon Survey ||  || align=right | 2.2 km || 
|-id=951 bgcolor=#d6d6d6
| 576951 ||  || — || December 6, 2012 || Mount Lemmon || Mount Lemmon Survey ||  || align=right | 2.0 km || 
|-id=952 bgcolor=#d6d6d6
| 576952 ||  || — || November 5, 2012 || Kitt Peak || Spacewatch ||  || align=right | 2.1 km || 
|-id=953 bgcolor=#E9E9E9
| 576953 ||  || — || September 9, 2007 || Kitt Peak || Spacewatch ||  || align=right | 2.2 km || 
|-id=954 bgcolor=#d6d6d6
| 576954 ||  || — || February 21, 2002 || Palomar || NEAT ||  || align=right | 4.3 km || 
|-id=955 bgcolor=#fefefe
| 576955 ||  || — || December 6, 2012 || Mount Lemmon || Mount Lemmon Survey ||  || align=right data-sort-value="0.62" | 620 m || 
|-id=956 bgcolor=#d6d6d6
| 576956 ||  || — || December 7, 2012 || Haleakala || Pan-STARRS ||  || align=right | 2.2 km || 
|-id=957 bgcolor=#d6d6d6
| 576957 ||  || — || November 12, 2012 || Mount Lemmon || Mount Lemmon Survey ||  || align=right | 1.8 km || 
|-id=958 bgcolor=#d6d6d6
| 576958 ||  || — || November 13, 2012 || Mount Graham || R. P. Boyle, V. Laugalys ||  || align=right | 2.2 km || 
|-id=959 bgcolor=#d6d6d6
| 576959 ||  || — || November 15, 2012 || Mount Lemmon || Mount Lemmon Survey ||  || align=right | 3.4 km || 
|-id=960 bgcolor=#d6d6d6
| 576960 ||  || — || December 4, 2012 || Mount Lemmon || Mount Lemmon Survey ||  || align=right | 2.4 km || 
|-id=961 bgcolor=#d6d6d6
| 576961 ||  || — || December 4, 2012 || Mount Lemmon || Mount Lemmon Survey ||  || align=right | 2.4 km || 
|-id=962 bgcolor=#d6d6d6
| 576962 ||  || — || October 15, 2001 || Palomar || NEAT ||  || align=right | 2.7 km || 
|-id=963 bgcolor=#d6d6d6
| 576963 ||  || — || November 24, 2012 || Kitt Peak || Spacewatch ||  || align=right | 2.3 km || 
|-id=964 bgcolor=#d6d6d6
| 576964 ||  || — || December 5, 2012 || Mount Lemmon || Mount Lemmon Survey ||  || align=right | 2.2 km || 
|-id=965 bgcolor=#d6d6d6
| 576965 ||  || — || December 5, 2012 || Mount Lemmon || Mount Lemmon Survey ||  || align=right | 1.8 km || 
|-id=966 bgcolor=#d6d6d6
| 576966 ||  || — || November 22, 2012 || Kitt Peak || Spacewatch ||  || align=right | 2.3 km || 
|-id=967 bgcolor=#E9E9E9
| 576967 ||  || — || September 13, 2002 || Palomar || NEAT ||  || align=right | 2.9 km || 
|-id=968 bgcolor=#d6d6d6
| 576968 ||  || — || September 2, 2011 || Haleakala || Pan-STARRS ||  || align=right | 2.8 km || 
|-id=969 bgcolor=#d6d6d6
| 576969 ||  || — || August 24, 2011 || Haleakala || Pan-STARRS ||  || align=right | 2.9 km || 
|-id=970 bgcolor=#fefefe
| 576970 ||  || — || December 5, 2012 || Mount Lemmon || Mount Lemmon Survey ||  || align=right data-sort-value="0.70" | 700 m || 
|-id=971 bgcolor=#d6d6d6
| 576971 ||  || — || October 22, 2006 || Catalina || CSS ||  || align=right | 2.7 km || 
|-id=972 bgcolor=#E9E9E9
| 576972 ||  || — || October 7, 2007 || Mount Lemmon || Mount Lemmon Survey ||  || align=right | 1.8 km || 
|-id=973 bgcolor=#E9E9E9
| 576973 ||  || — || December 30, 2008 || Mount Lemmon || Mount Lemmon Survey ||  || align=right | 2.1 km || 
|-id=974 bgcolor=#d6d6d6
| 576974 ||  || — || December 17, 2007 || Kitt Peak || Spacewatch ||  || align=right | 2.7 km || 
|-id=975 bgcolor=#E9E9E9
| 576975 ||  || — || June 12, 2011 || Mount Lemmon || Mount Lemmon Survey ||  || align=right | 1.5 km || 
|-id=976 bgcolor=#d6d6d6
| 576976 ||  || — || October 21, 2012 || Haleakala || Pan-STARRS ||  || align=right | 3.0 km || 
|-id=977 bgcolor=#d6d6d6
| 576977 ||  || — || December 7, 2012 || Kitt Peak || Spacewatch ||  || align=right | 3.3 km || 
|-id=978 bgcolor=#d6d6d6
| 576978 ||  || — || November 12, 2007 || Mount Lemmon || Mount Lemmon Survey ||  || align=right | 2.4 km || 
|-id=979 bgcolor=#FA8072
| 576979 ||  || — || November 26, 2012 || Mount Lemmon || Mount Lemmon Survey || H || align=right data-sort-value="0.62" | 620 m || 
|-id=980 bgcolor=#fefefe
| 576980 ||  || — || December 8, 2012 || Catalina || CSS ||  || align=right data-sort-value="0.72" | 720 m || 
|-id=981 bgcolor=#d6d6d6
| 576981 ||  || — || December 31, 2007 || Mount Lemmon || Mount Lemmon Survey ||  || align=right | 2.3 km || 
|-id=982 bgcolor=#d6d6d6
| 576982 ||  || — || December 8, 2012 || Mount Lemmon || Mount Lemmon Survey ||  || align=right | 3.0 km || 
|-id=983 bgcolor=#d6d6d6
| 576983 ||  || — || September 21, 2011 || Mount Lemmon || Mount Lemmon Survey ||  || align=right | 2.4 km || 
|-id=984 bgcolor=#d6d6d6
| 576984 ||  || — || December 5, 2012 || Mount Lemmon || Mount Lemmon Survey ||  || align=right | 2.3 km || 
|-id=985 bgcolor=#d6d6d6
| 576985 ||  || — || September 20, 2011 || Haleakala || Pan-STARRS ||  || align=right | 3.0 km || 
|-id=986 bgcolor=#d6d6d6
| 576986 ||  || — || November 18, 2007 || Mount Lemmon || Mount Lemmon Survey ||  || align=right | 2.4 km || 
|-id=987 bgcolor=#fefefe
| 576987 ||  || — || December 8, 2012 || Kitt Peak || Spacewatch ||  || align=right data-sort-value="0.58" | 580 m || 
|-id=988 bgcolor=#d6d6d6
| 576988 ||  || — || June 11, 2010 || Mount Lemmon || Mount Lemmon Survey ||  || align=right | 2.6 km || 
|-id=989 bgcolor=#fefefe
| 576989 ||  || — || October 9, 2002 || Anderson Mesa || LONEOS ||  || align=right data-sort-value="0.85" | 850 m || 
|-id=990 bgcolor=#d6d6d6
| 576990 ||  || — || December 9, 2012 || Haleakala || Pan-STARRS ||  || align=right | 1.9 km || 
|-id=991 bgcolor=#d6d6d6
| 576991 ||  || — || January 1, 2008 || Kitt Peak || Spacewatch ||  || align=right | 3.2 km || 
|-id=992 bgcolor=#d6d6d6
| 576992 ||  || — || September 19, 2006 || Kitt Peak || Spacewatch ||  || align=right | 2.4 km || 
|-id=993 bgcolor=#fefefe
| 576993 ||  || — || November 26, 2012 || Mount Lemmon || Mount Lemmon Survey ||  || align=right data-sort-value="0.40" | 400 m || 
|-id=994 bgcolor=#d6d6d6
| 576994 ||  || — || November 19, 2001 || Anderson Mesa || LONEOS ||  || align=right | 2.6 km || 
|-id=995 bgcolor=#d6d6d6
| 576995 ||  || — || December 20, 2001 || Kitt Peak || Spacewatch ||  || align=right | 2.8 km || 
|-id=996 bgcolor=#d6d6d6
| 576996 ||  || — || June 2, 2003 || Kitt Peak || Spacewatch ||  || align=right | 3.1 km || 
|-id=997 bgcolor=#E9E9E9
| 576997 ||  || — || October 22, 2003 || Kitt Peak || Spacewatch ||  || align=right | 1.9 km || 
|-id=998 bgcolor=#d6d6d6
| 576998 ||  || — || November 6, 2012 || Kitt Peak || Spacewatch ||  || align=right | 2.7 km || 
|-id=999 bgcolor=#d6d6d6
| 576999 ||  || — || December 11, 2012 || Mount Lemmon || Mount Lemmon Survey ||  || align=right | 2.2 km || 
|-id=000 bgcolor=#d6d6d6
| 577000 ||  || — || December 11, 2012 || Mount Lemmon || Mount Lemmon Survey ||  || align=right | 2.5 km || 
|}

References

External links 
 Discovery Circumstances: Numbered Minor Planets (575001)–(580000) (IAU Minor Planet Center)

0576